= Charles-Louis Clérisseau =

French architect and artist (1721–1820)

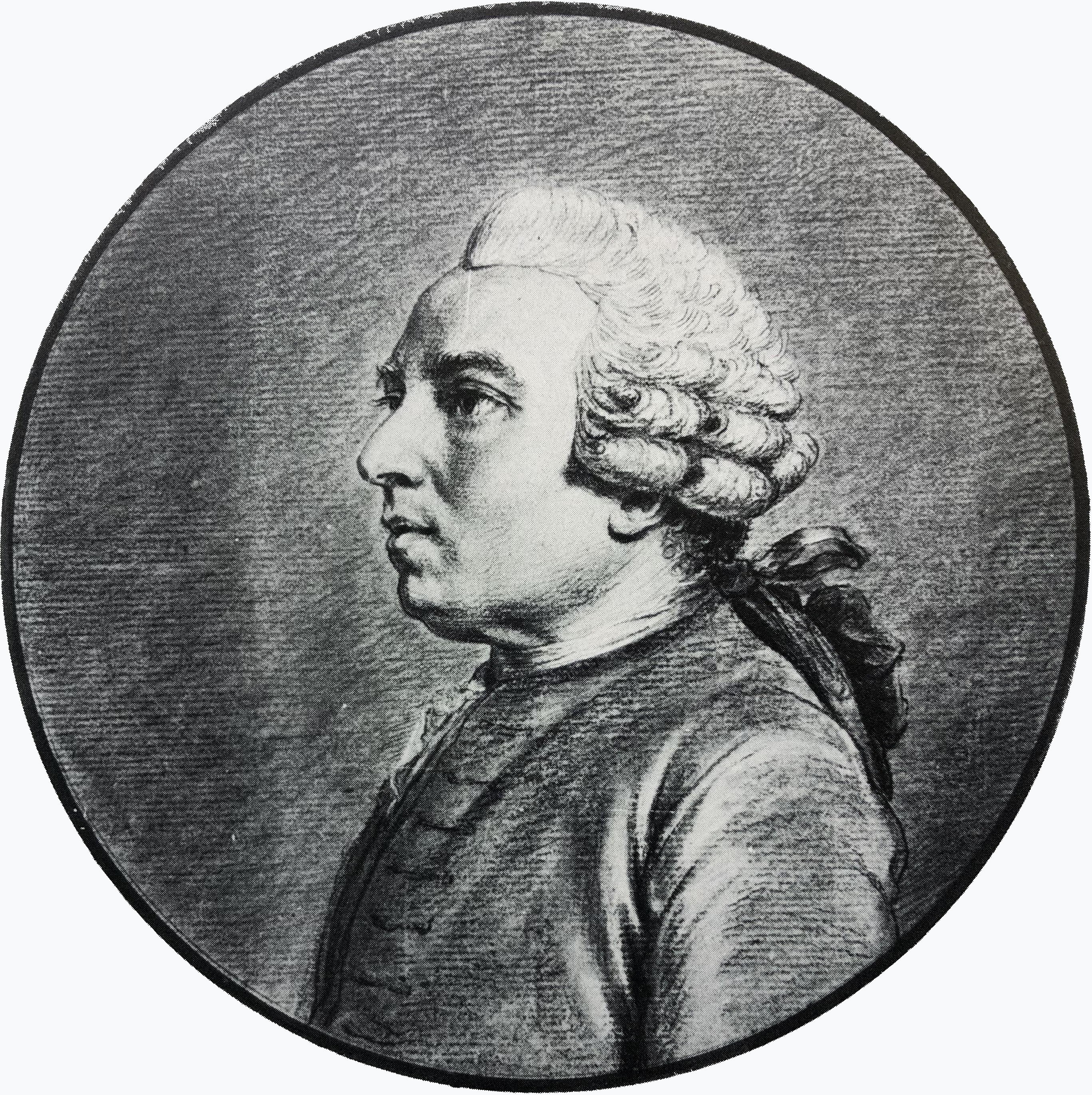
- Born: Charles-Louis Clérisseau; 28 August 1721; Paris, France
- Died: 9 January 1820 (aged 98); Auteuil, Paris, France
- Education: Germain Boffrand, Giovanni Paolo Pannini, French Academy in Rome
- Works: Antiquités de la France (1788)
- Movement: Neoclassicism
- Awards: Prix de Rome (Premier Prix, Architecture, 1746), Chevalier of the Legion of Honor (1815)

Signature
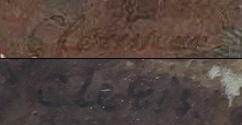

Charles-Louis Clérisseau (28 August 1721 – 9 January 1820) was a French architect, draughtsman, antiquary, and artist who became a leading authority on ancient Roman architecture and Roman ruins in Italy and France. With his influence extending to Russia, England, and the United States, and clients including Catherine the Great and Thomas Jefferson, Clérisseau played a key role in the genesis of neoclassical architecture during the second half of the 18th century.

== Education; career in Rome ==
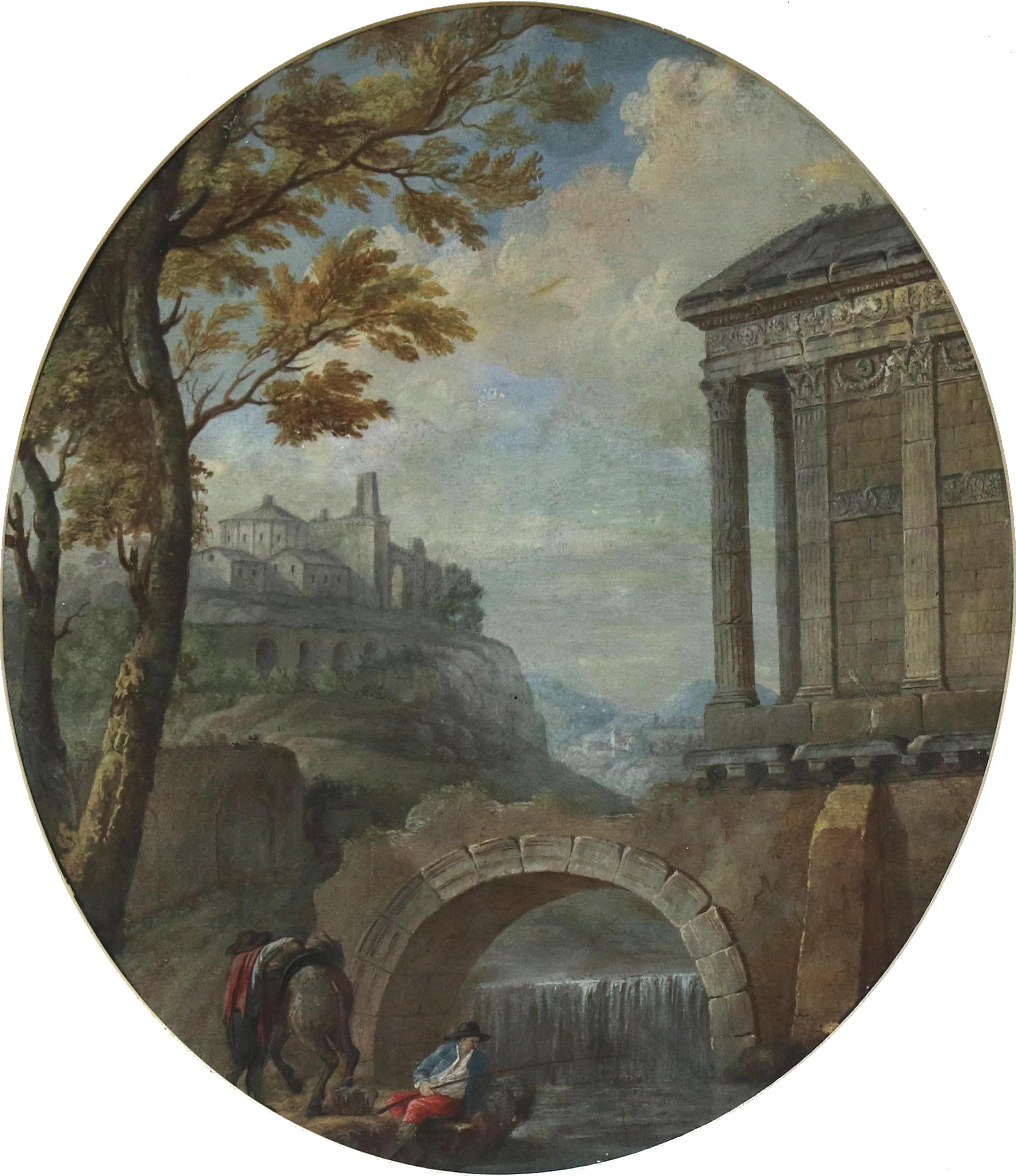
Classical Scene (1769), private collection.

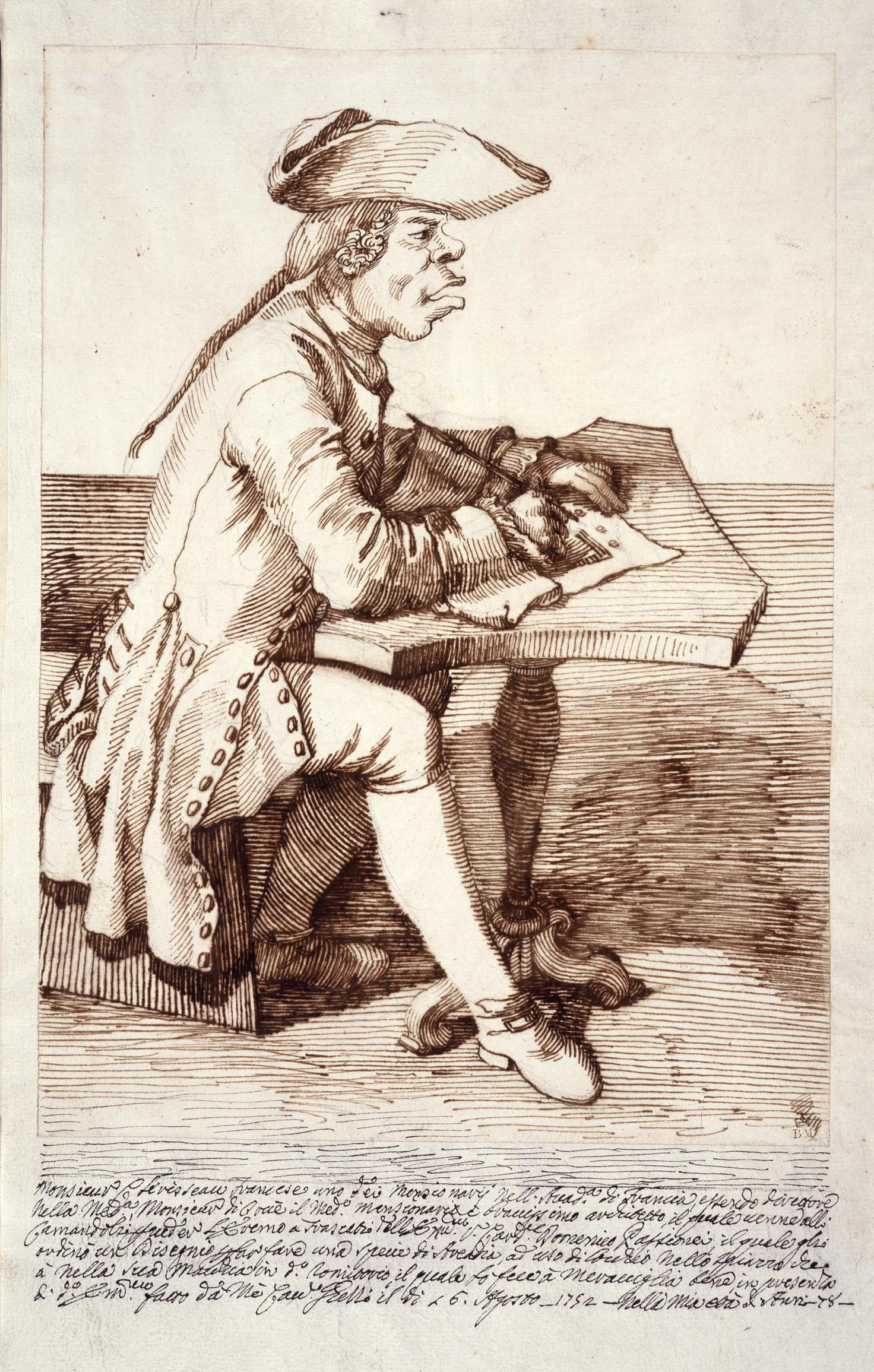
Pier Leone Ghezzi's caricature of Clérisseau when he was a student at the French Academy in Rome (1752), British Museum.

Born in Paris, Clérisseau was a pupil of the architect Germain Boffrand.

In 1746, in his mid-twenties, he won a Premier Prix de Rome in the architectural competition to design Un grand hôtel, or great mansion. The prize included a scholarship to study in Rome, and in 1749 Clérisseau became an official pensionnaire (resident) at the French Academy in Rome, where his instructors included the vedutista Giovanni Paolo Pannini.

In Rome, he also befriended Giovanni Battista Piranesi and Claude-Joseph Vernet, and in 1752 the three of them set out on a sketching tour of Hadrian's Villa at Tivoli. Before beginning to draw, the three first had to cut and burn away the undergrowth, where lurked colonies of venomous snakes and scorpions.

In 1753, Clérisseau's final months at the Academy were marred by a bitter dispute with its director, Charles-Joseph Natoire. Clérisseau was for a time expelled, but was eventually allowed to return and complete his scholarship.

In 1755 the Scottish architect Robert Adam arrived in Florence, where he met Clérisseau, who accompanied him to Rome; there the ambitious Adam resolved, under thea of Clérisseau, to produce a volume for publication upon his return to Britain that would establish him as a serious architect. The project finally selected was a volume documenting the ruins of Diocletian's Palace at Split, on the Dalmatian coast. Over a period of five weeks in 1757 Adam sketched and supervised the documentation of the ruins, while Clérisseau produced perspectives, and two German draftsmen undertook the measured drawings. Most of the published engravings in Adam's Ruins of the Palace of the Emperor Diocletian at Spalatro (1764) are believed to be the work of Clérisseau, though he received no credit.

Clérisseau passed most of the next decades in Rome. As it had done since the High Renaissance, ancient Rome and modern Rome functioned as a cultural hub, the ruins of Classical Antiquity providing a school in themselves, if one had a knowledgeable guide. Clérisseau served as a mentor to a generation of young architectural students who (like Clérisseau) had won the prestigious Prix de Rome and came to study at the French Academy in Rome. He also guided the developing taste for the Antique in young French and British artists and gentlemen amateurs on the Grand Tour. His skillful drawings of ancient architectural details, of real Roman ruins and imaginary ones, helped form the taste of young architects like Robert Adam in the 1750s and his brother James Adam, in 1760-63. Clérisseau added to his income by providing architectural illustrations, sometimes in series, for young men on the Grand Tour.

On the first of December, 1763, in San Luigi dei Francesi (Church of St. Louis of the French) in Rome, Clérisseau married Therèse, daughter of the sculptor Pierre de l'Estache. "Clérisseau was forty-two and Therése was presumably much younger, though her father was about seventy-five at the time."

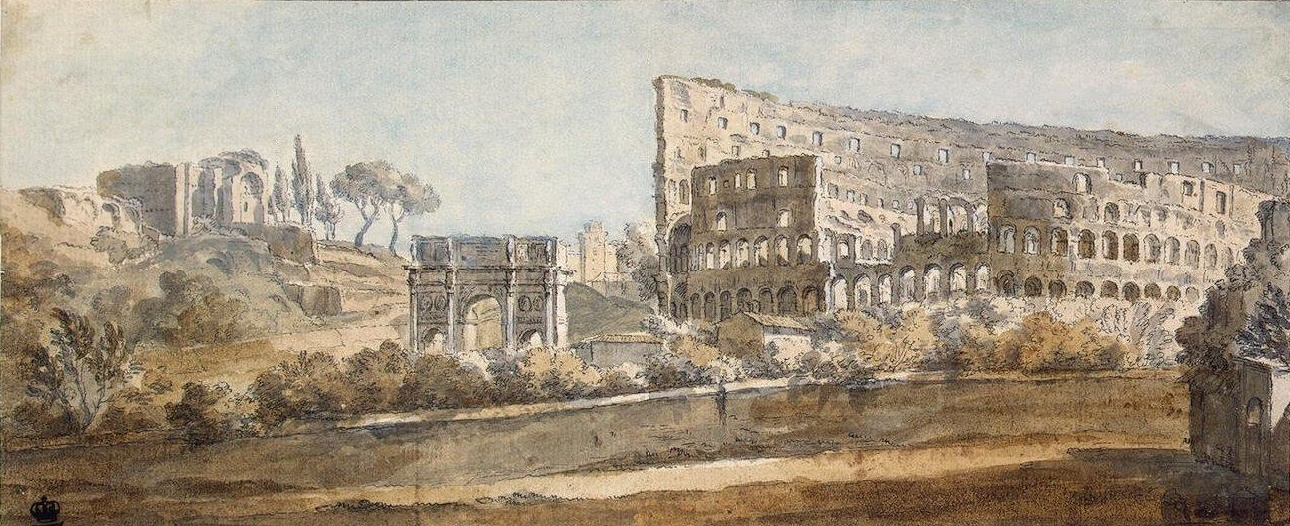
View of the Colosseum in Rome (between 1750 and 1755), Hermitage

== Return to Paris; dealings with Catherine the Great and Thomas Jefferson ==
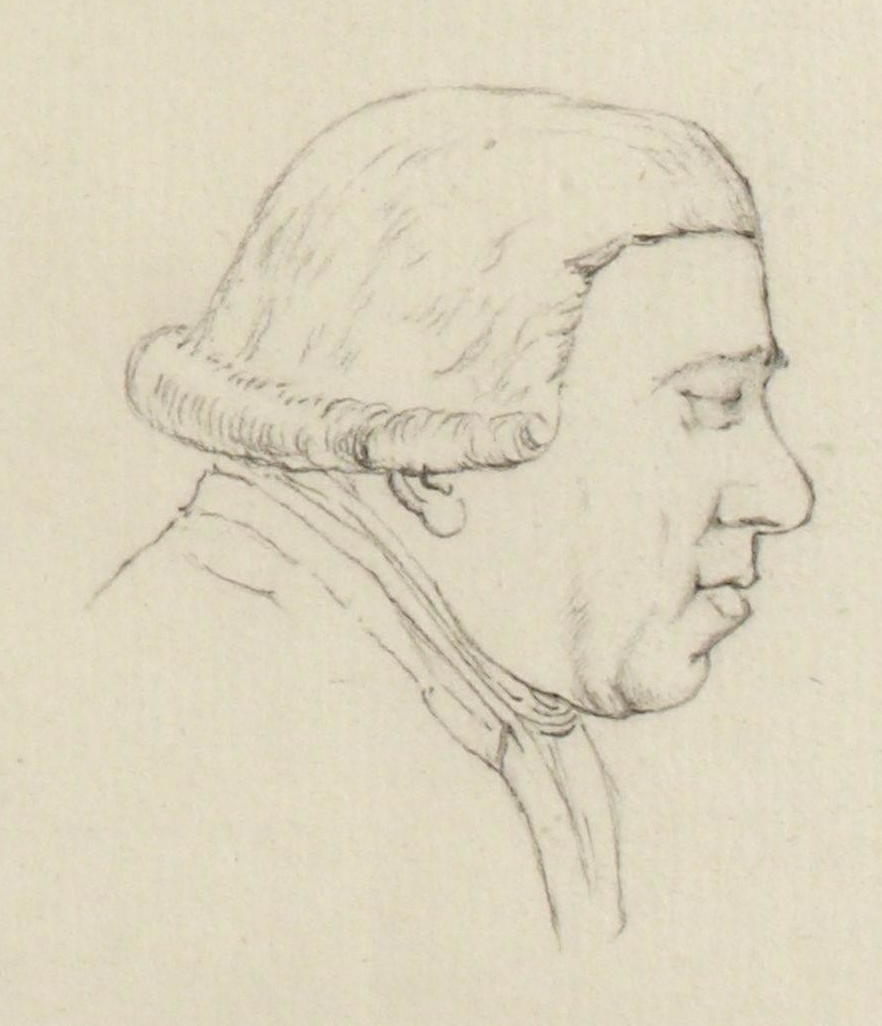
Profile of Clérisseau sketched by an anonymous artist in 1809, Musée Carnavalet

Upon his return to Paris in the summer of 1767, Clérisseau became a magnet for young neoclassical architects, like François-Joseph Bélanger, who themselves never visited Rome.

Although they never met, and he never traveled to Russia, Clérisseau nonetheless attracted the attention of Catherine the Great, who in 1773 solicited from him plans for a house in a style à l'antique to be erected in her gardens at Tsarskoye Selo. Catherine was vexed when she received the plans, which were far more elaborate than she expected, "a grandiose Roman palace" described "as the Baths of Caracalla set into Hadrian's Villa." There is no evidence that Clérisseau was ever paid for the rejected plans. Nevertheless, in 1778 Catherine again approached him, through an emissary, and arranged to purchase over a thousand drawings and artworks from him; this huge cache would ultimately find a home in the Hermitage. In 1780 she asked Clérisseau to design a triumphal arch to be built in Russia, but when the plans arrived she decided the gigantic project would be too large and expensive and abandoned it.

Profile of Clérisseau sketched by his disciple Jacques-Guillaume Legrand, Musée Carnavalet.

Although his projects for Catherine never came to fruition, Clérisseau's drawings and designs were highly influential in the decoration of her apartments at Tsarskoye Selo. In recognition of his artistic achievements and his efforts on her behalf, the empress made Clérisseau an honorary member of the Imperial Academy of Arts and bestowed on him the title Premier Architecte de Sa Majestée Impériale.

For the Hôtel Grimod de La Reynière, built in Paris in 1775, Clérisseau and Étienne de La Vallée Poussin executed the first decorative scheme in Europe to be inspired by the recent archaeological discoveries at Pompeii and Herculanum. A set of eight painted boiseries depicting sixteen scenes from the life of Achilles were sold in 1850 and are now in the collection of the Victoria and Albert Museum in London.

In 1785, Clérisseau was retained by Thomas Jefferson to produce designs for the Virginia State Capitol in Richmond, based on the Maison Carrée, the ancient Roman temple in Nîmes. At the time, Jefferson was residing in Paris, serving as American Minister to France. Jefferson wrote that "it was a considerable time before I could find an architect whose taste had been formed on a study of ancient models of this art; the style of architecture in this capital [Paris] being far from chaste." Clérisseau, he noted, "has studied 20 years in Rome, and has given proofs of his skill and taste by a publication of some antiquities of this country." Jefferson was referring to the first (and only) volume in Clérisseau's intended series Antiquités de la France, published in Paris in 1778 with the subtitle Monumens de Nismes. The folio included detailed engravings of the Maison Carrée, which Jefferson praised as "one of the most beautiful, if not the most beautiful and precious morsel of architecture left us by antiquity."

"Clérisseau's role in designing the Capitol has been much debated. Fiske Kimball argues persuasively that the building is essentially Jefferson's and that Clérisseau was merely a consultant."

== Clérisseau in museums and exhibitions ==
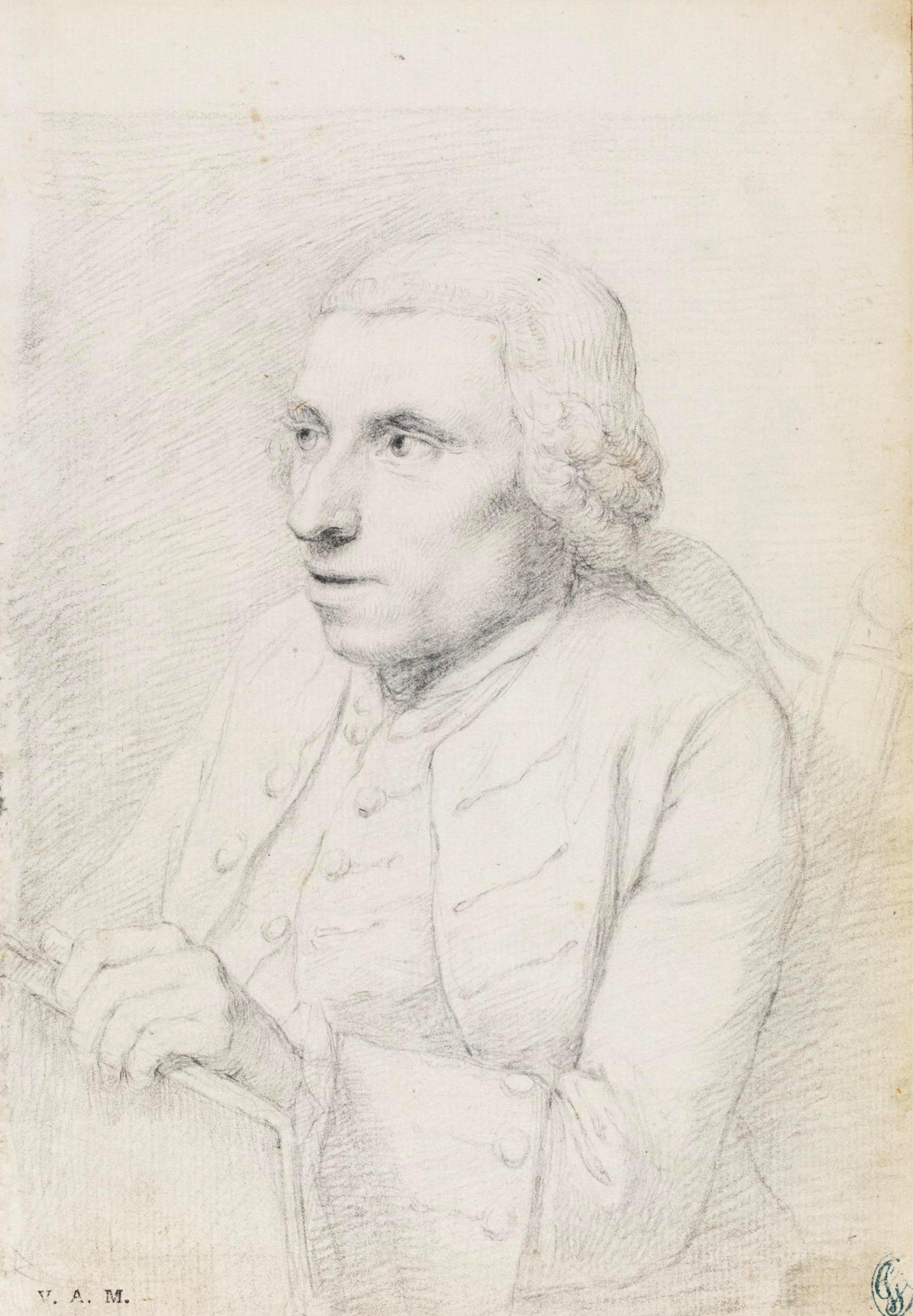
Presumed portrait of Clérisseau by Angelica Kauffmann, late 1790s, Victoria and Albert Museum

Clérisseau created works on paper using a variety of media, often in combination, including pencil, chalk, ink, watercolor, and gouache. Many of his works were reproduced as etchings by engravers including Domenico Cunego (the series Views of Antique Buildings and Famous Ruins in Italy), Francesco Bartolozzi, Francesco Zucchi and Paolo Santini.

In his lifetime, Clérisseau exhibited works at the Paris Salon in Salon of 1773, Salon of 1775, Salon of 1783 and Salon of 1808

The largest cache of Clérisseau's work is in the collection of the Hermitage in St. Petersburg. An exhibition of these works was presented in 1995 at the Louvre in Paris, and in 1996 at the Hermitage; an illustrated catalogue with notes and essays was published in 1995 in Paris by Editions de la Réunion des Musées Nationaux.

Large groups of works by of Clérisseau are also conserved at Sir John Soane's Museum in London (four drawings and twenty-two works in gouache can be seen at the museum's web site) and at the Fitzwilliam Museum, Cambridge.

Works by Clérisseau are also in the collections of the Louvre, the Musée Cantini in Marseille, the Victoria and Albert Museum, the Royal Collection Trust, the Whitworth Art Gallery at the University of Manchester, the Albertina in Vienna, the Rijksmuseum, the Metropolitan Museum of Art, the Museum of Fine Arts, Boston, the Fleming Museum of Art at the University of Vermont, the Blanton Museum in Austin, the Huntington Library in San Marino, California, and the Legion of Honor in San Francisco.

== Clérisseau at auction ==
In 2019, a work by Clérisseau described as "Roman ruins with oriental staffage," was auctioned at Sotheby's for $32,500.

In 2018, a work by Clérisseau described as "View of the interior of an antique Roman bath," signed, was auctioned at Sotheby's for £11,875.

In 2016, a work by Clérisseau described as "A classical capriccio with figures by a great arch," signed and dated 1786, was auctioned at Christie's for £13,750

In 2015, a lot of two works by Clérisseau described as "The Arch of Titus, Rome; and The Forum of Nerva, Rome," both signed, was auctioned at Christie's for £20,000.

In 2014, a lot of two works by Clérisseau described as "Ancient gate at Cumae near Naples; Grotto of Egeria on the Via Appia," both signed and dated 1769, was auctioned at Sotheby's for $20,000.

In 2013, a work by Clérisseau described as "Capriccio of roman ruins, with figures in the foreground," signed, was auctioned at Sotheby's for £20,000. Also in 2013, a work by Clérisseau described as "A capriccio of Classical ruins with peasants in the foreground," signed and dated 1773, was auctioned at Sotheby's for $40,635.

In 2012, a lot of two works by Clérisseau described as "Two architectural capricci with peasants, musicians and other figures frolicking among classical ruins," signed and dated 1773 and 1774, was auctioned at Christie's for $74,500. At the same auction, another lot of two works by Clérisseau described as "Architectural capriccio; and The Tomb of the Curiatii at Albano," the first signed and dated 1781, the second signed, was auctioned at Christie's for $11,250.

In 2010, a lot of two works by Clérisseau described as "Interiors of a Roman Basilica with Figures," both signed and dated 1769, was auctioned at Christie's for £51,650.

== Gallery (chronological) ==
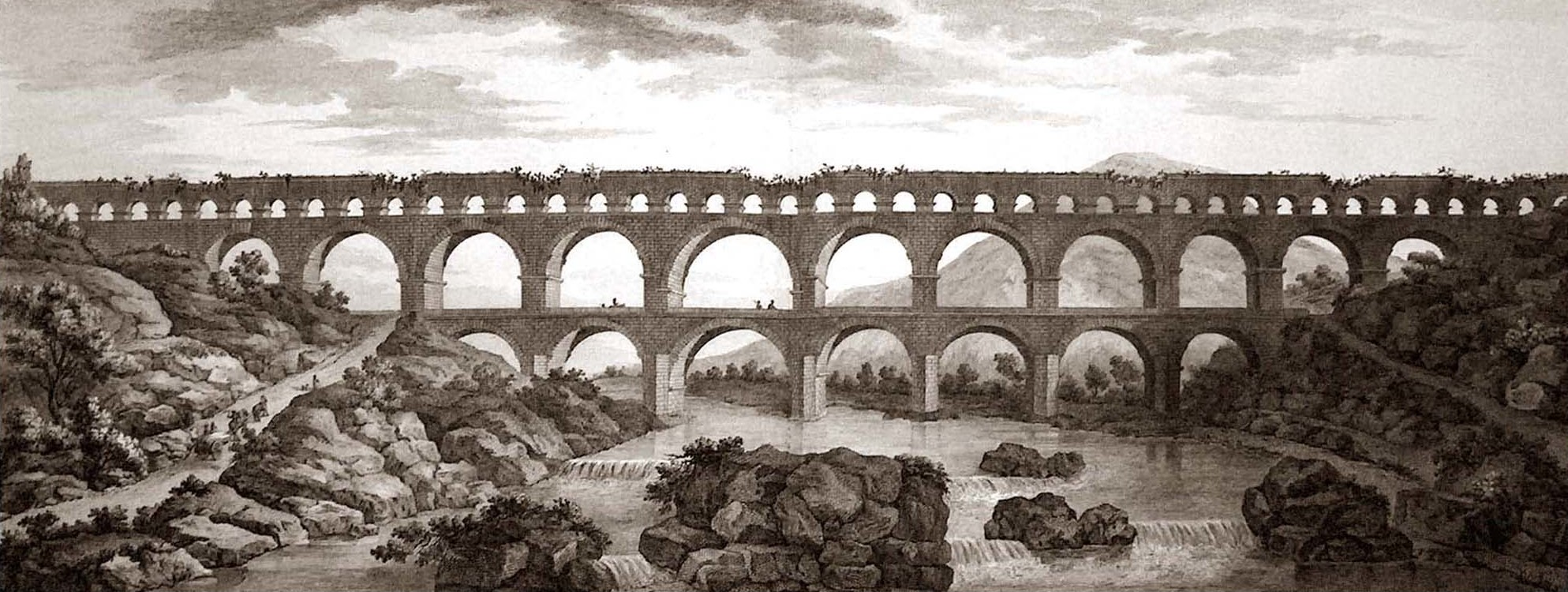
Vue générale du Pont du Gard (1804) from the book Antiquités de la France (1788)
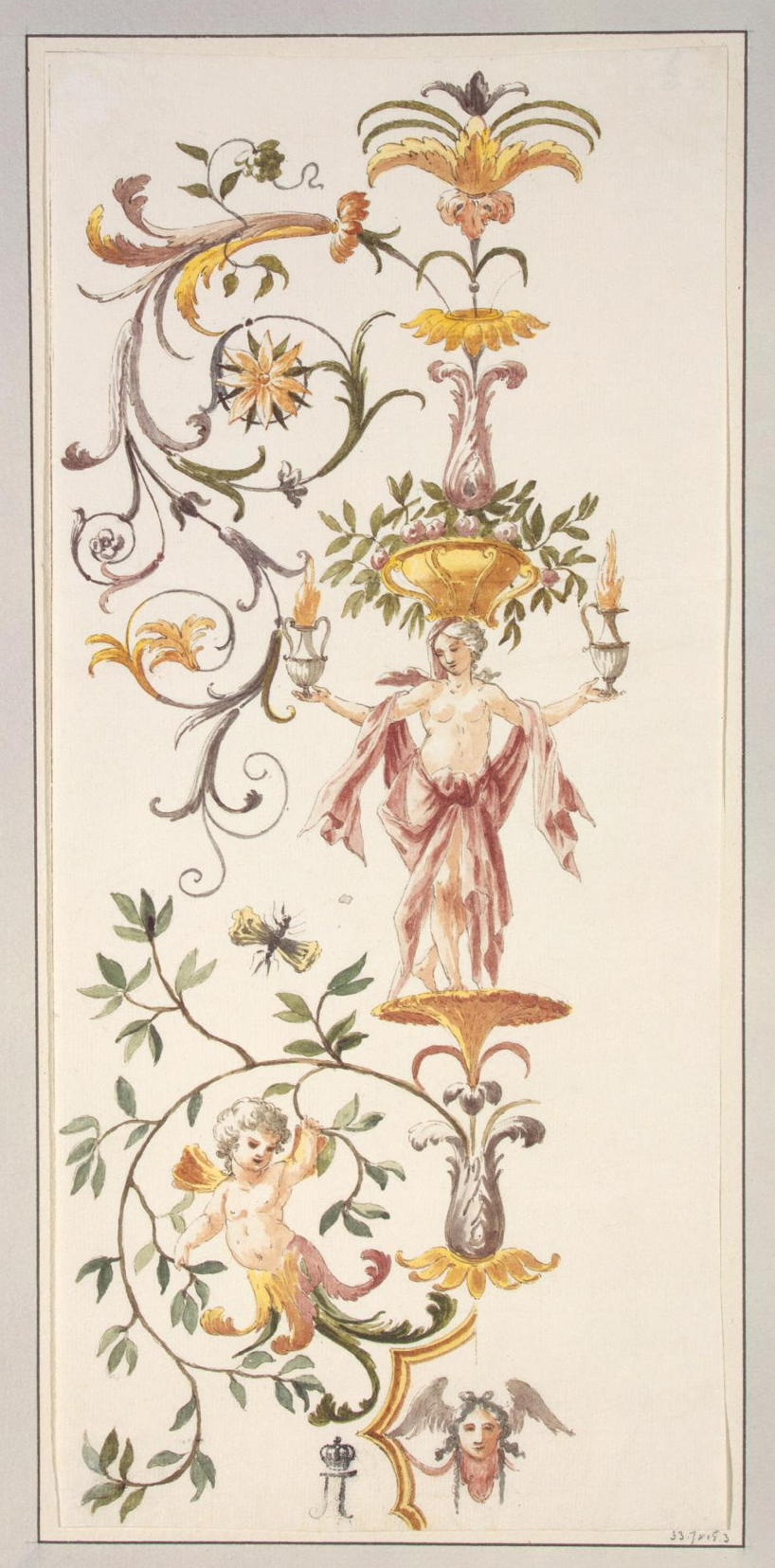
Ornamentation in the Grotesque Style (between 1750 and 1755), Hermitage

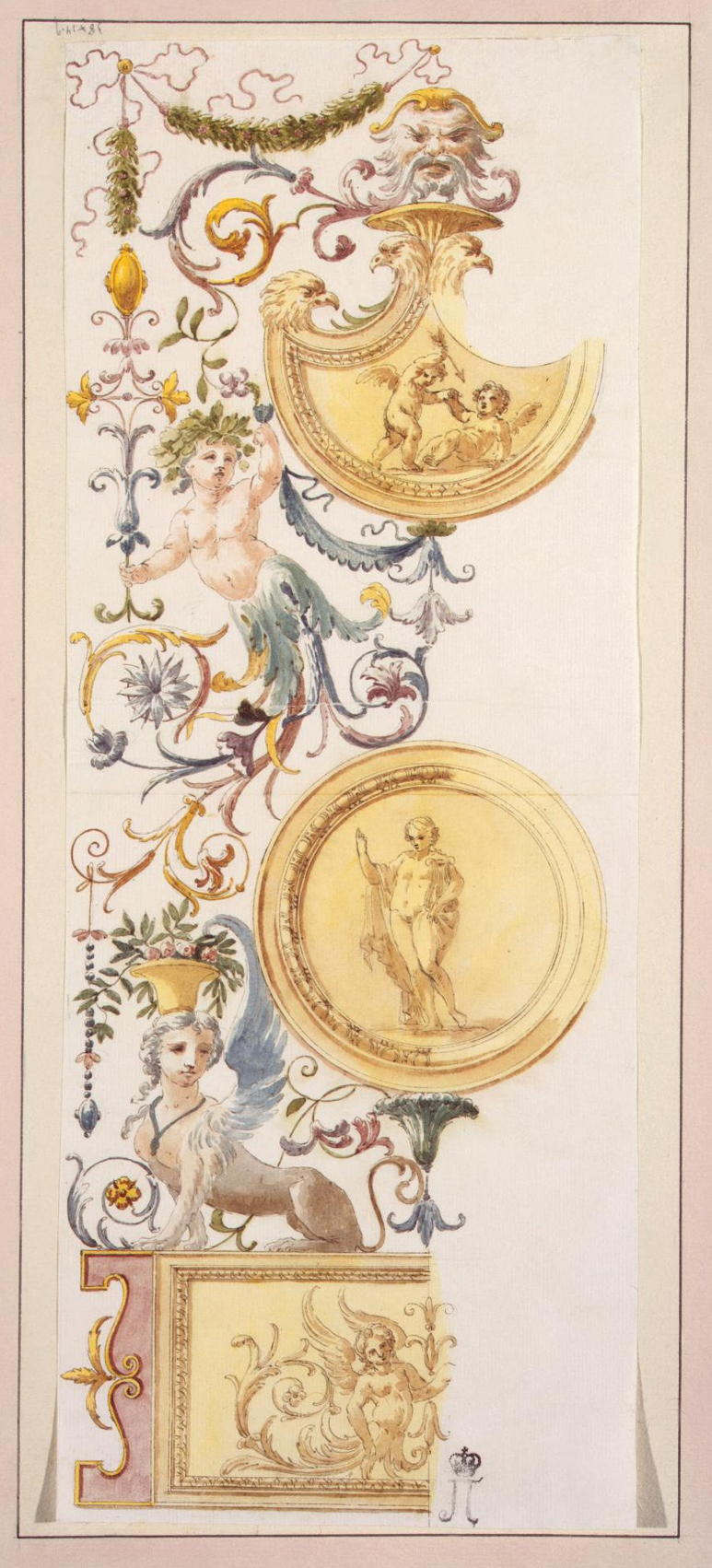
Ornamentation in the Grotesque Style (between 1750 and 1755), Hermitage

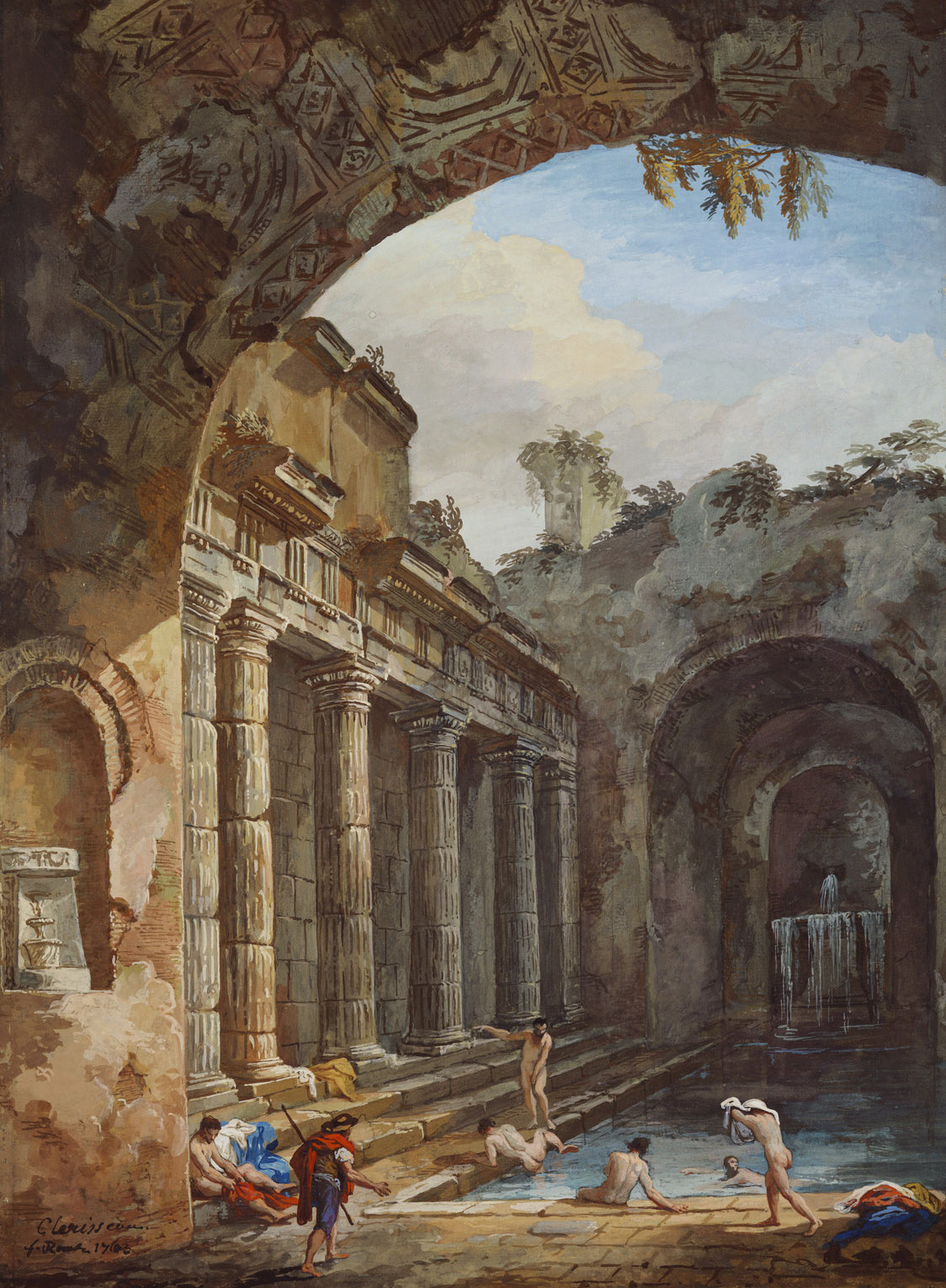
Ruins of a Roman Bath, 1763, Royal Collection Trust

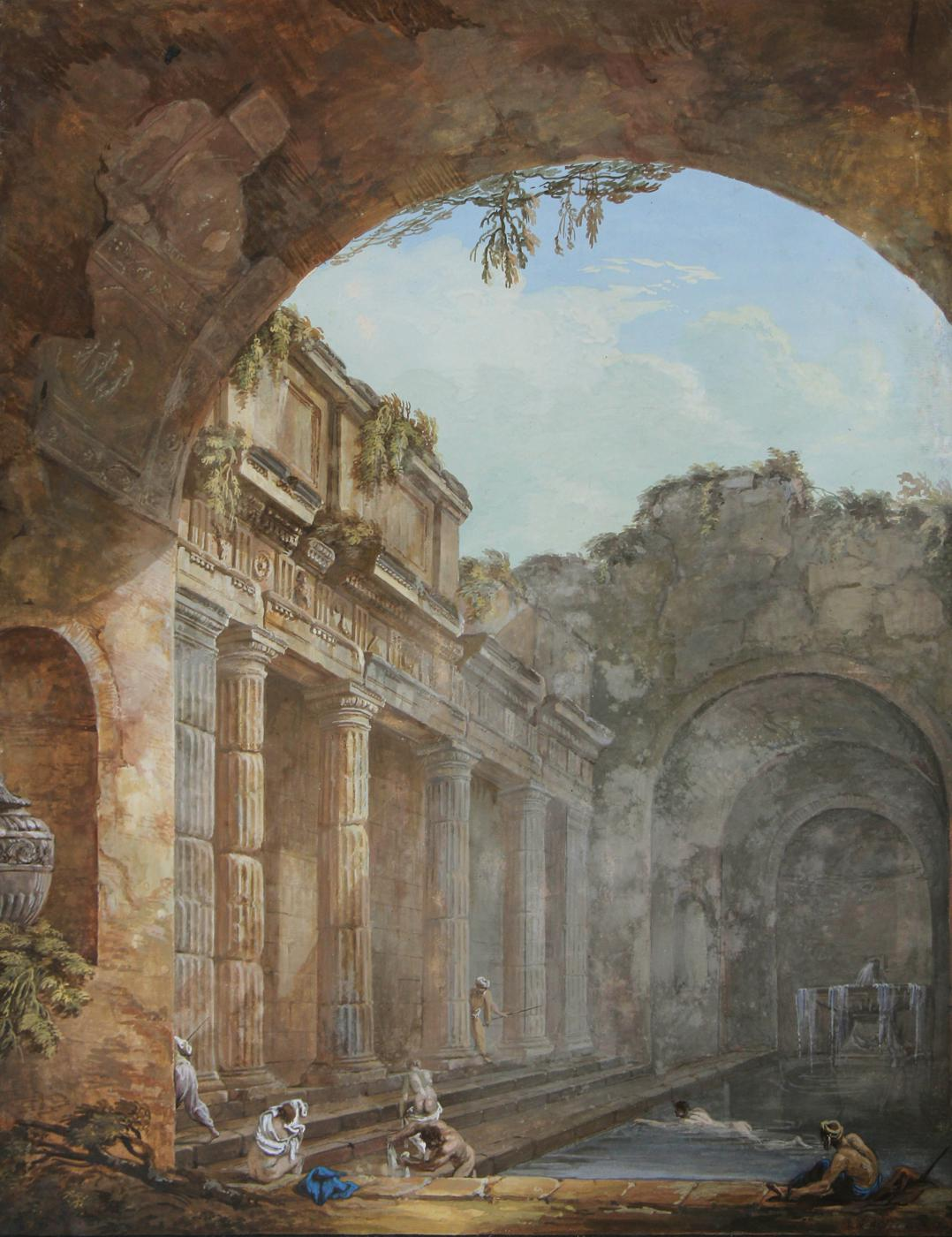
Ruins of an ancient bath, 1764, Fleming Museum of Art, University of Vermont

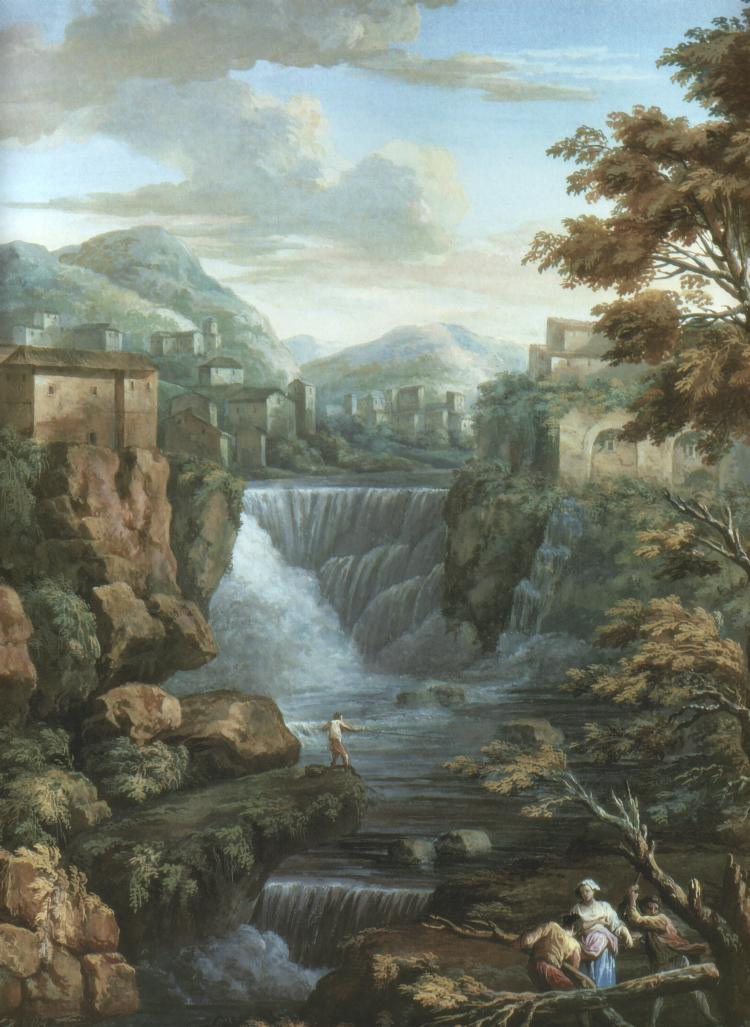
Falls of the Aniene at Tivoli (1769), Victoria and Albert Museum

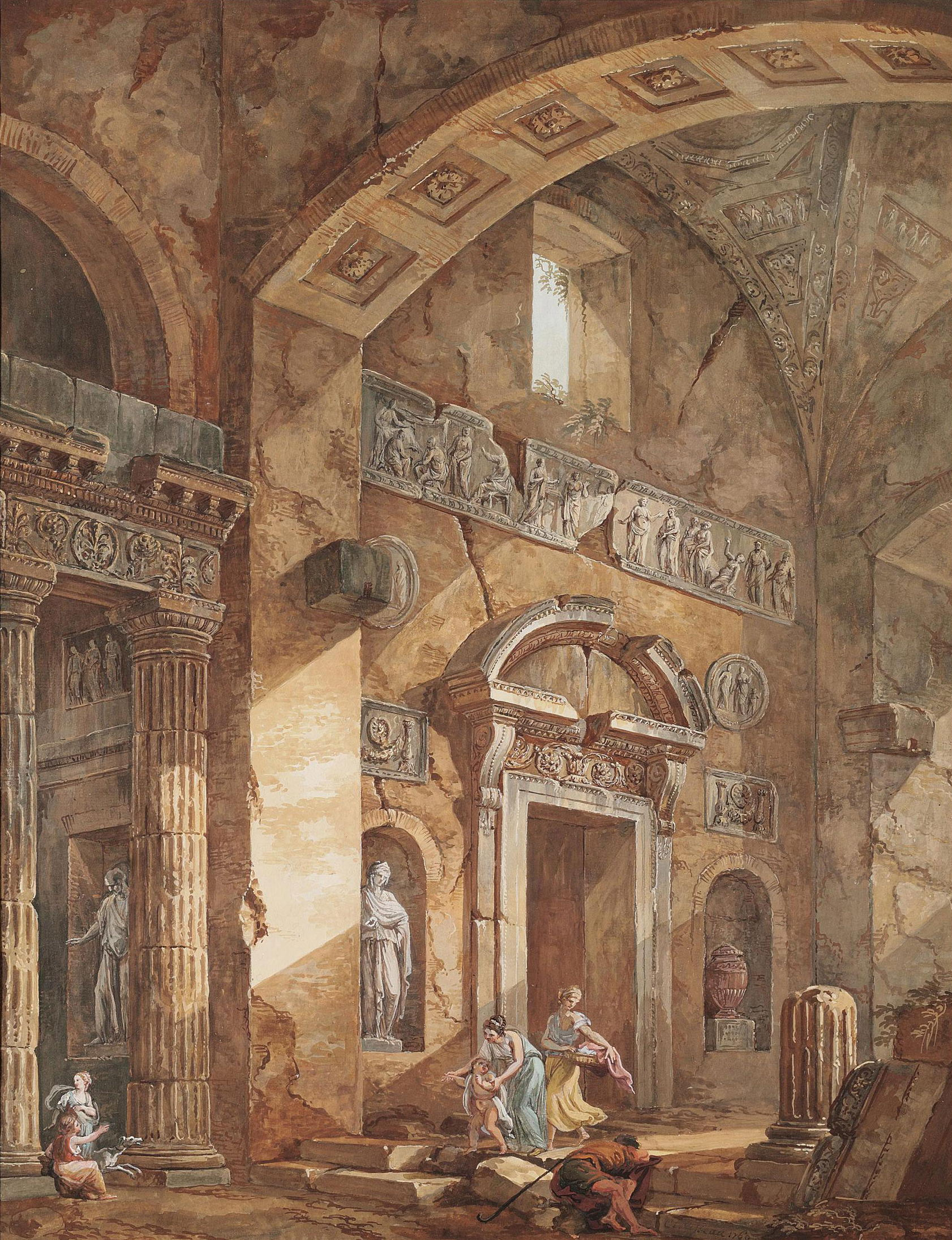
Interior of a Roman basilica with figures (1769), private collection.

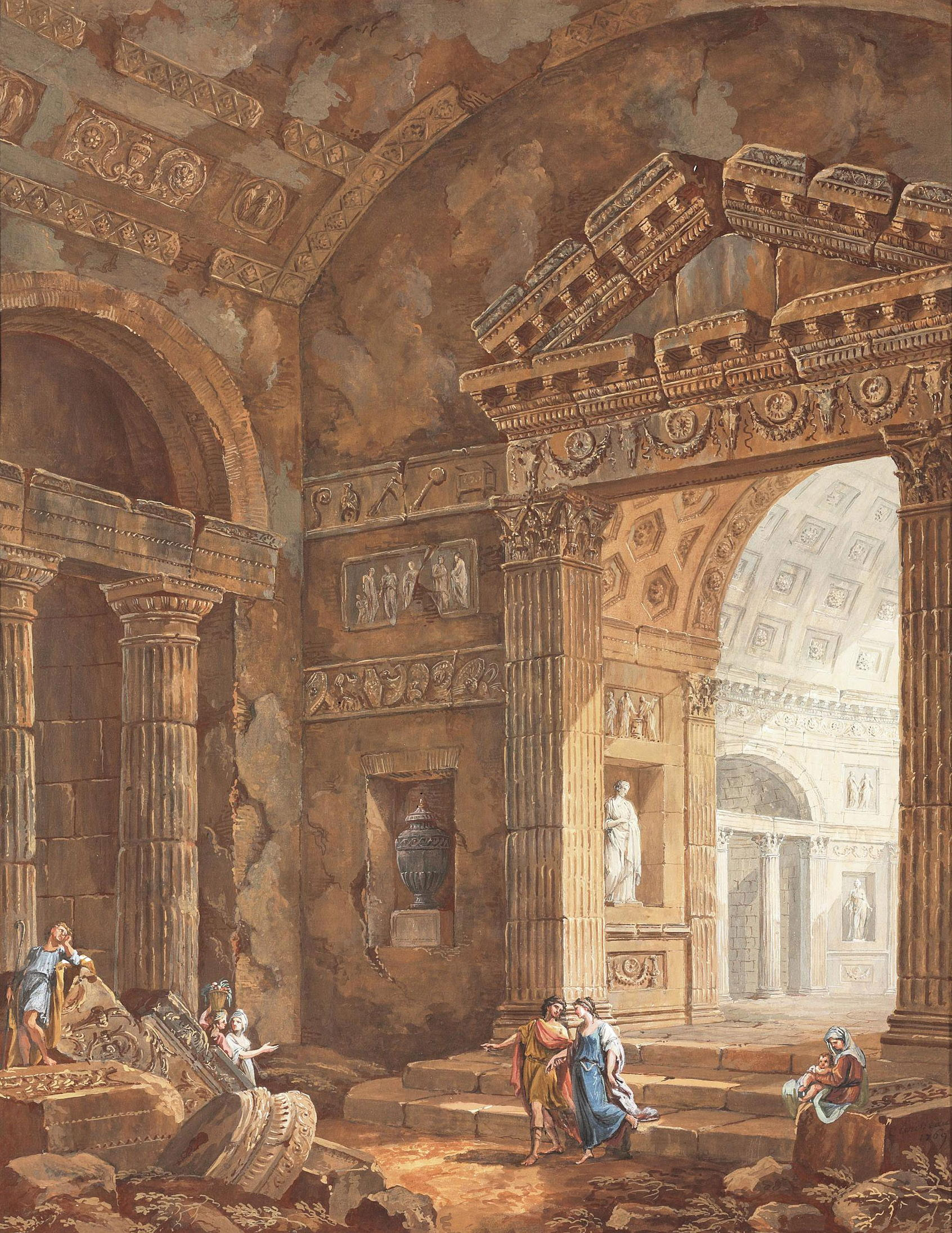
Interior of a Roman basilica with figures (1769), private collection.

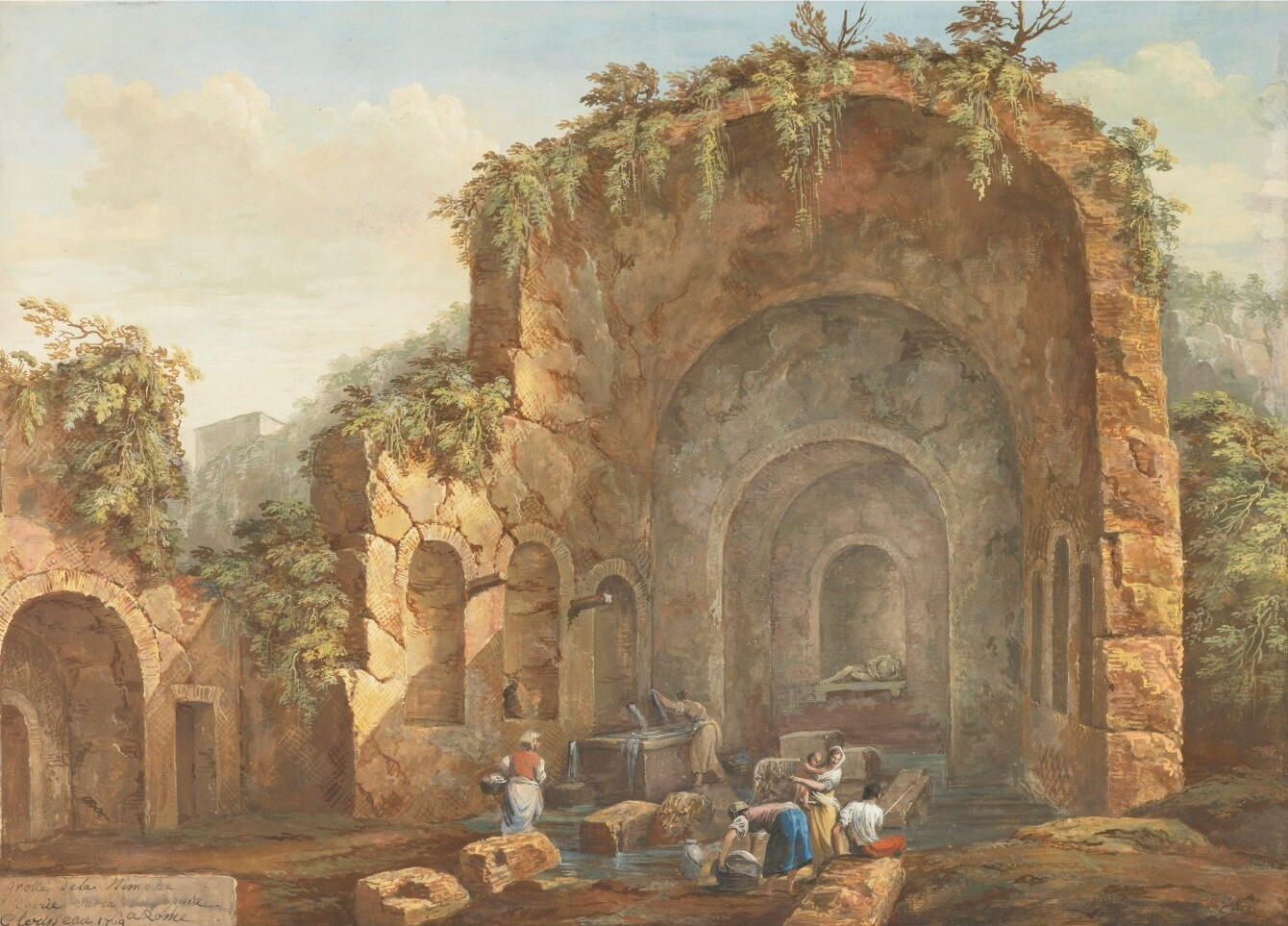
Grotto of Egeria on the Via Appia (1769), private collection

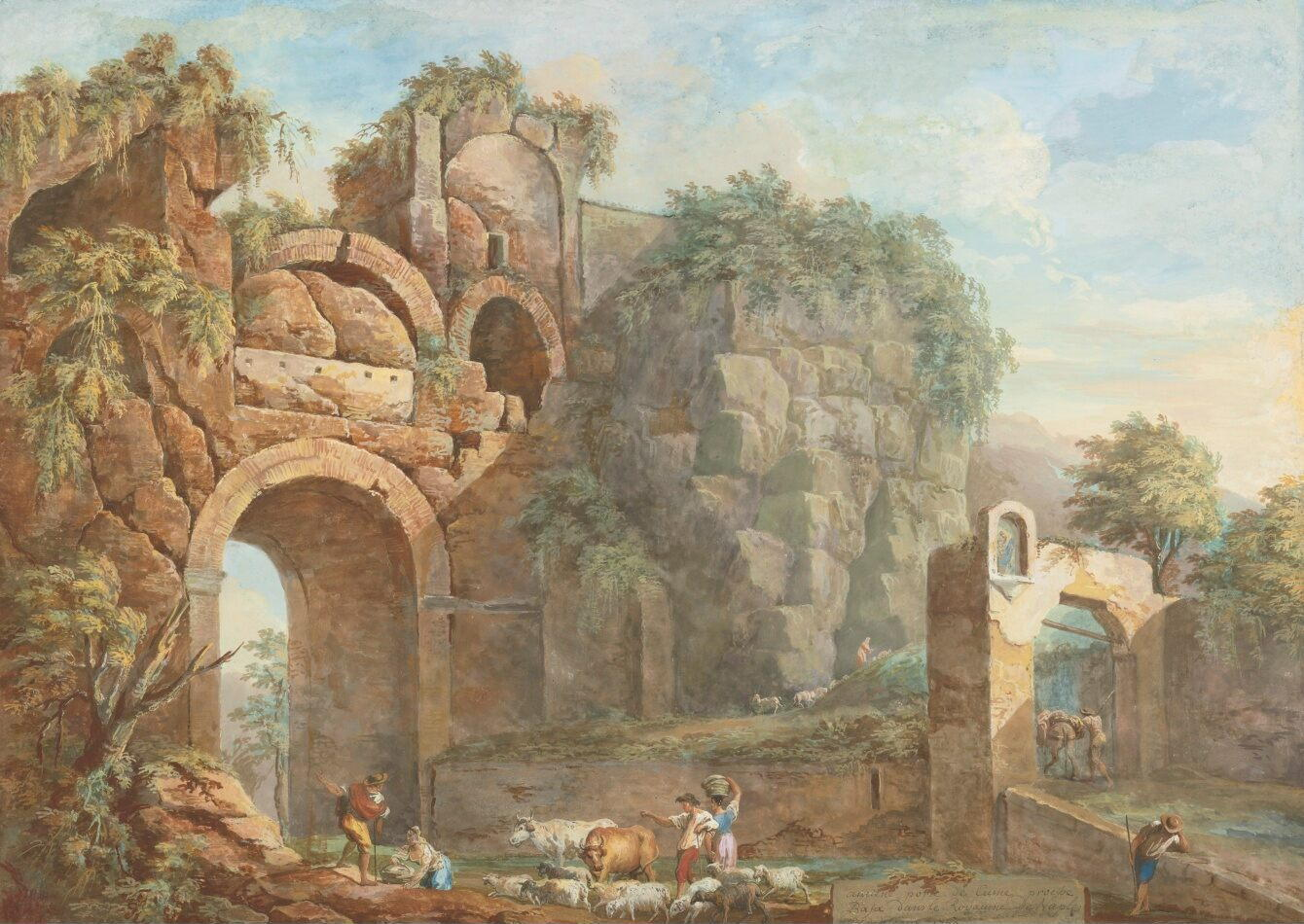
Ancient gate at Cumae near Naples (1769), private collection

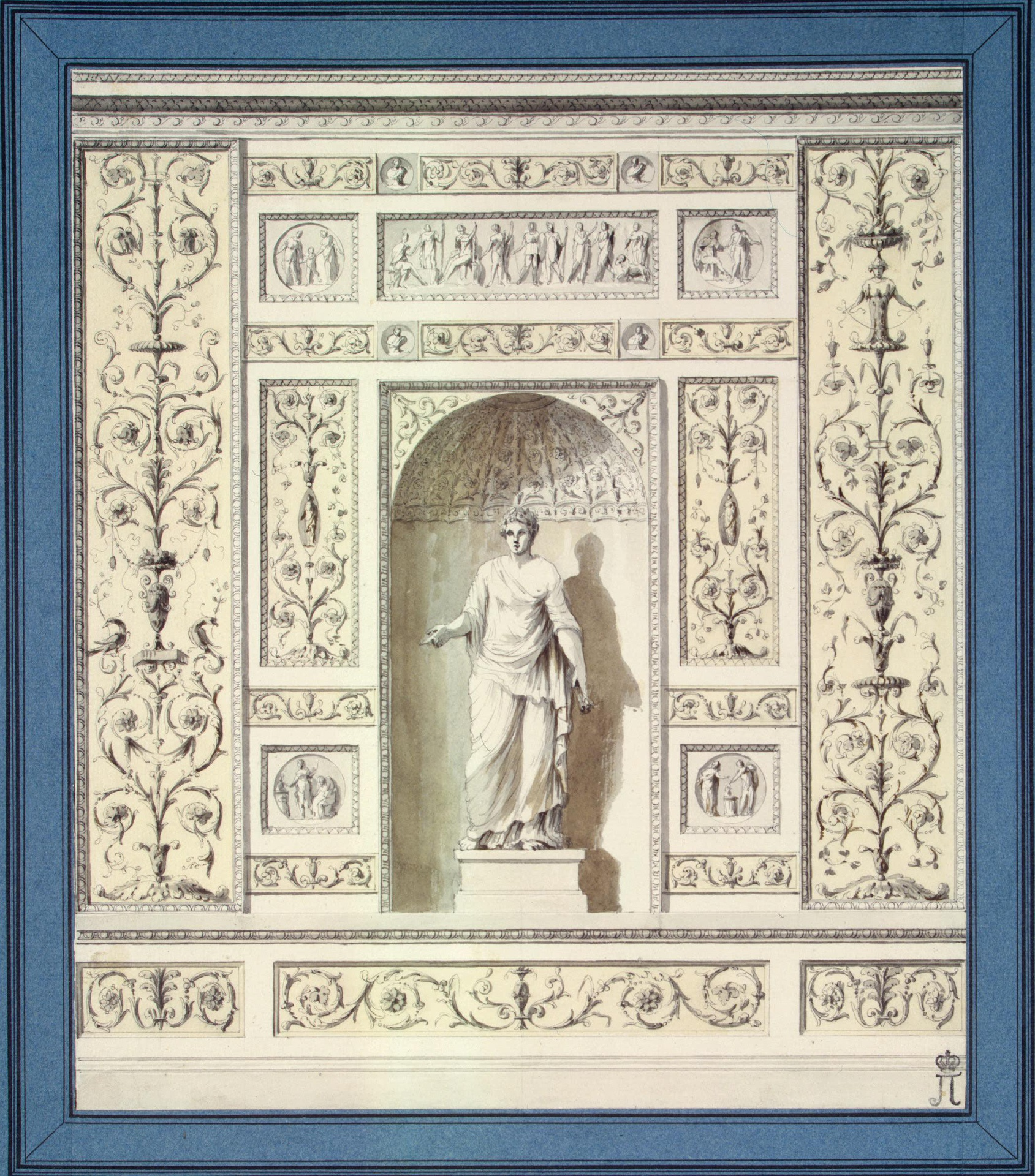
Interior decoration for museum of Catherine the Great (before 1773), Hermitage

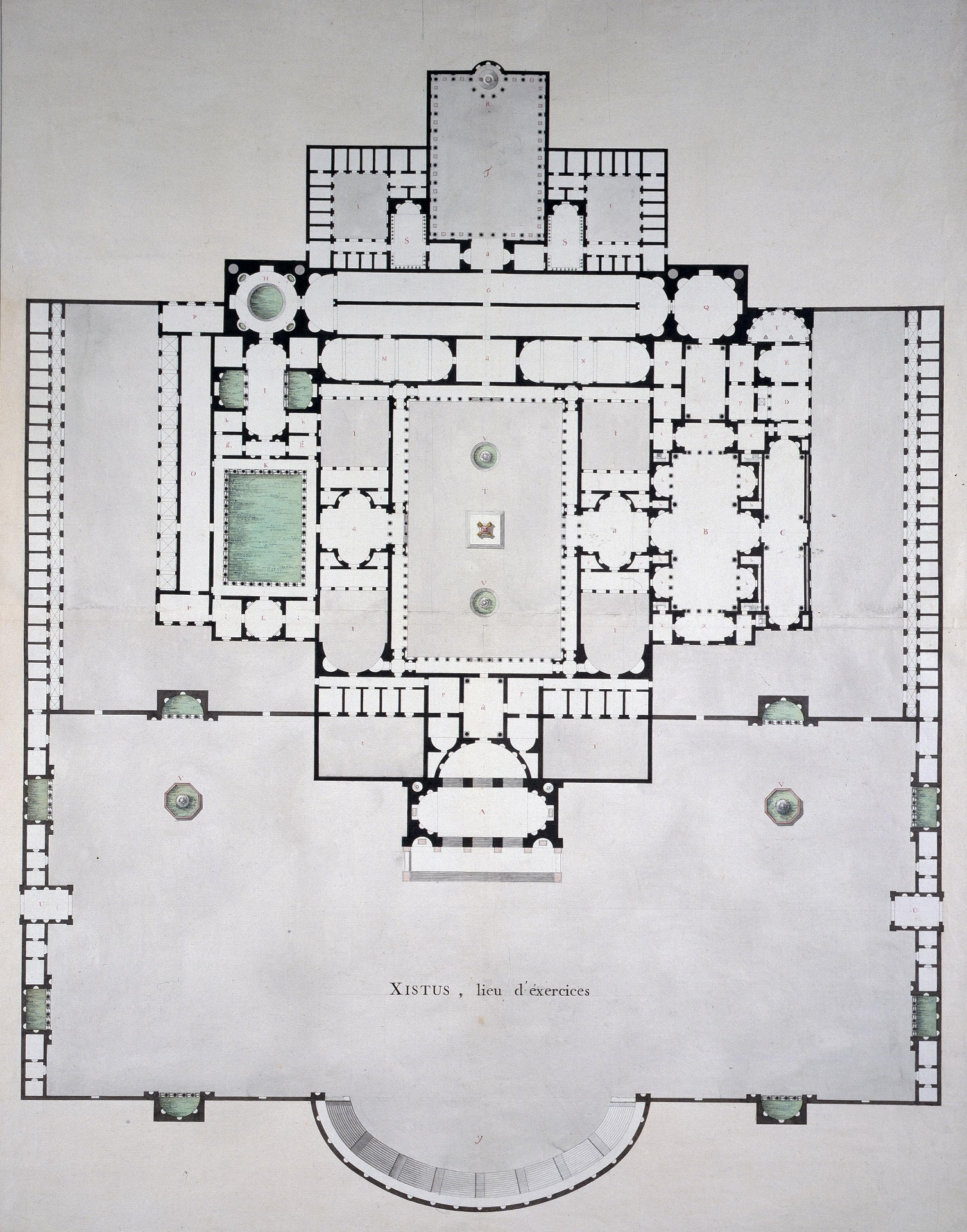
Plan of Antique House of Catherine the Great (1773), Hermitage

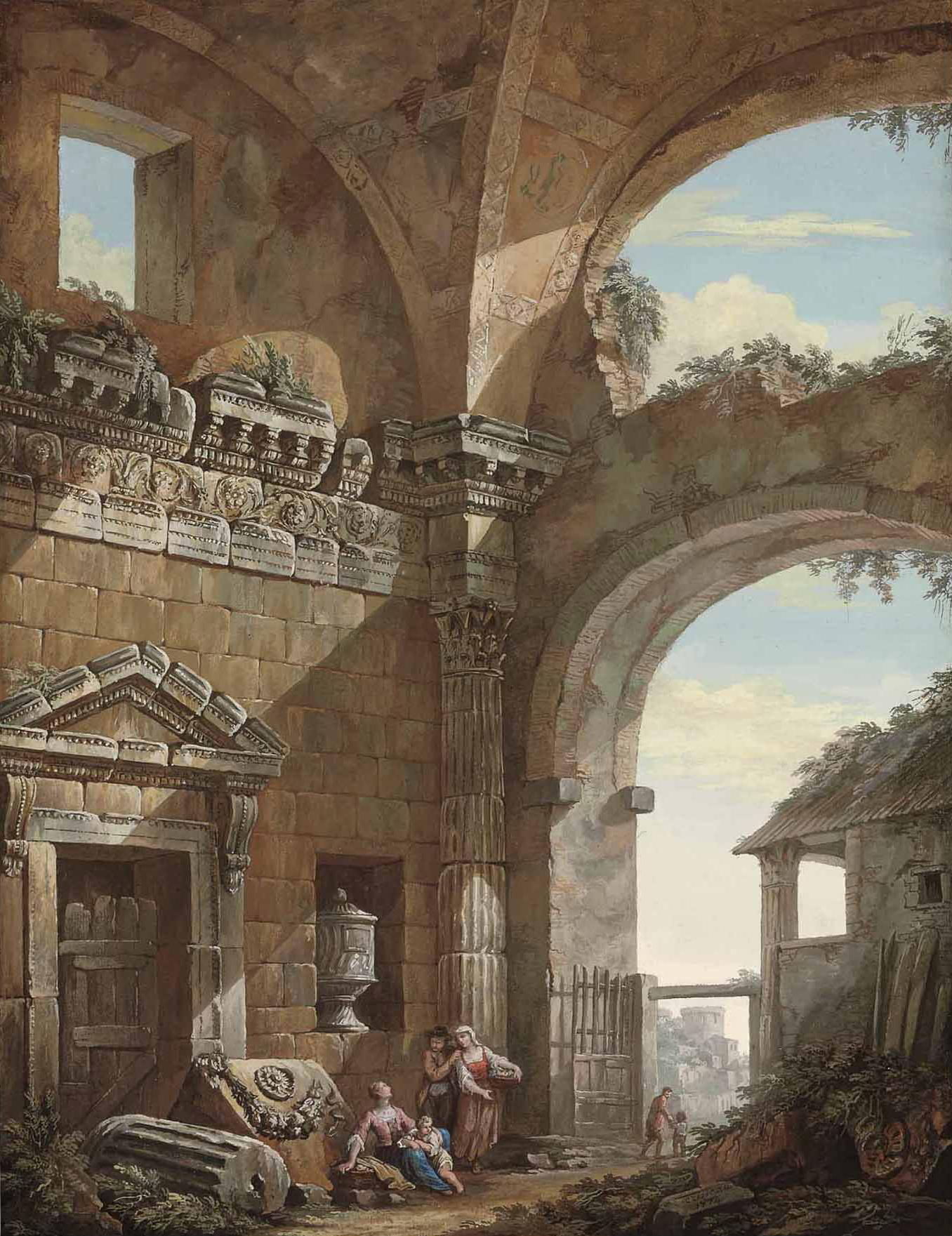
Architectural capriccio with peasants (1773), private collection.

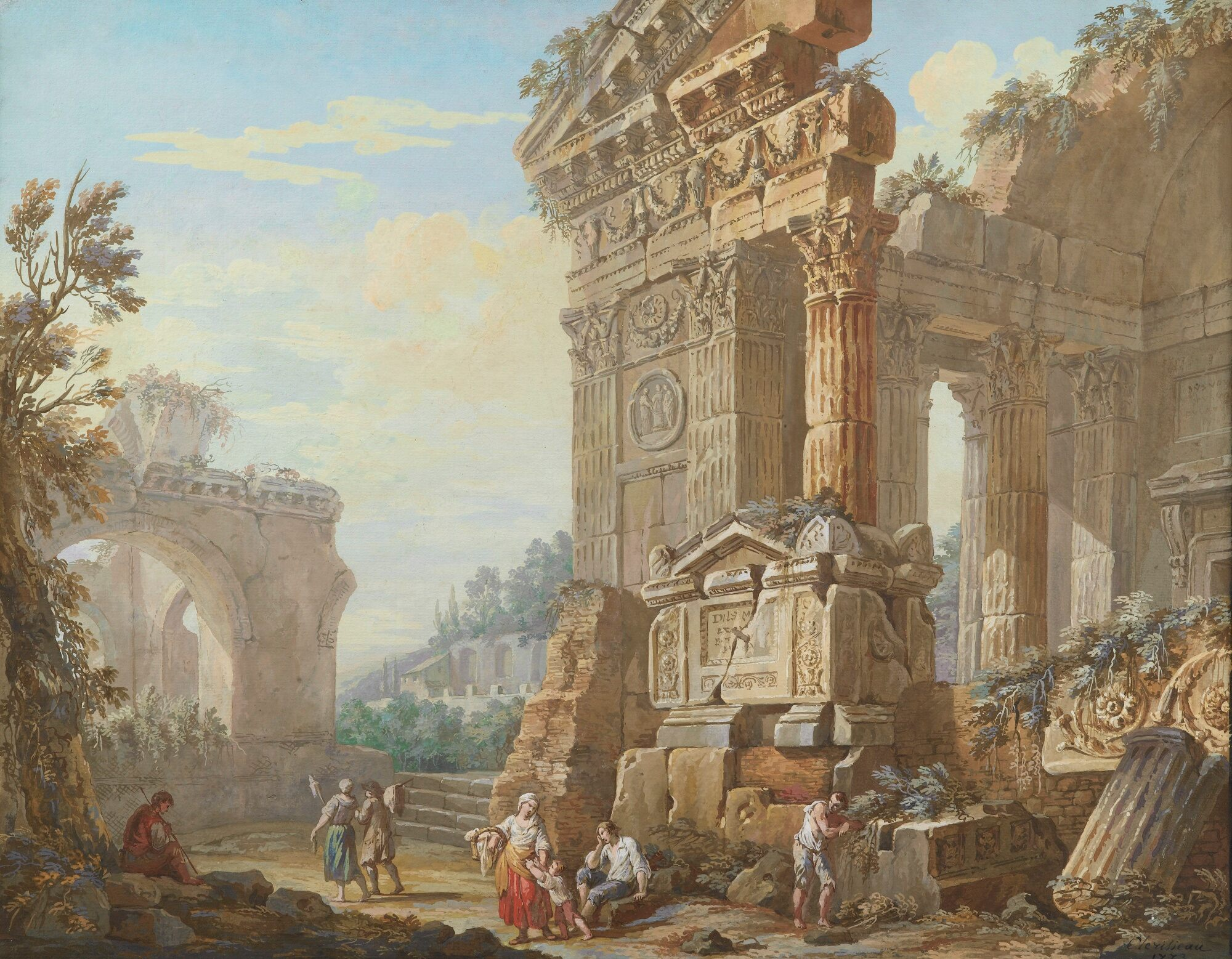
Capriccio of Roman ruins with peasants in the foreground (1773), private collection

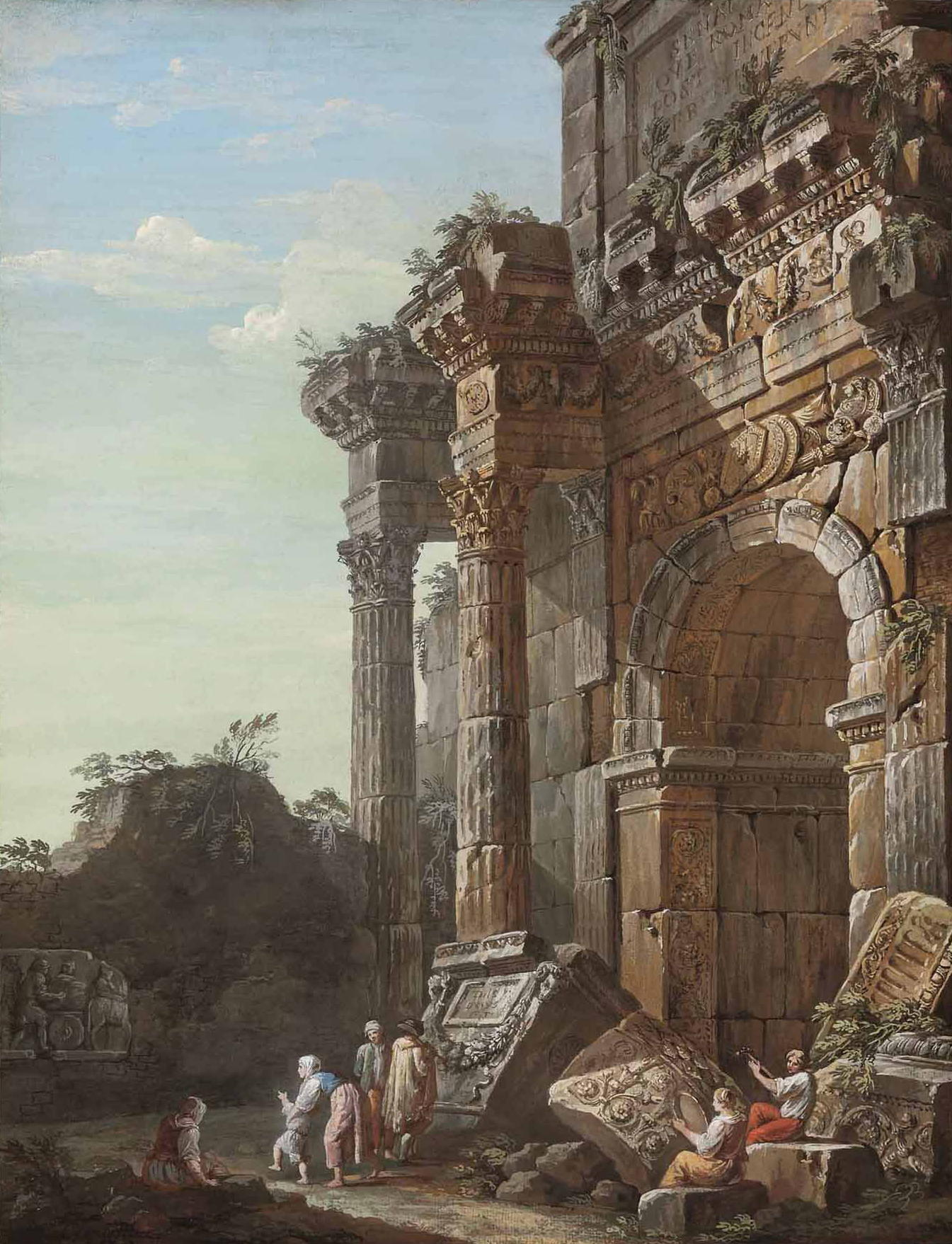
Architectural capriccio with peasants (1774), private collection.

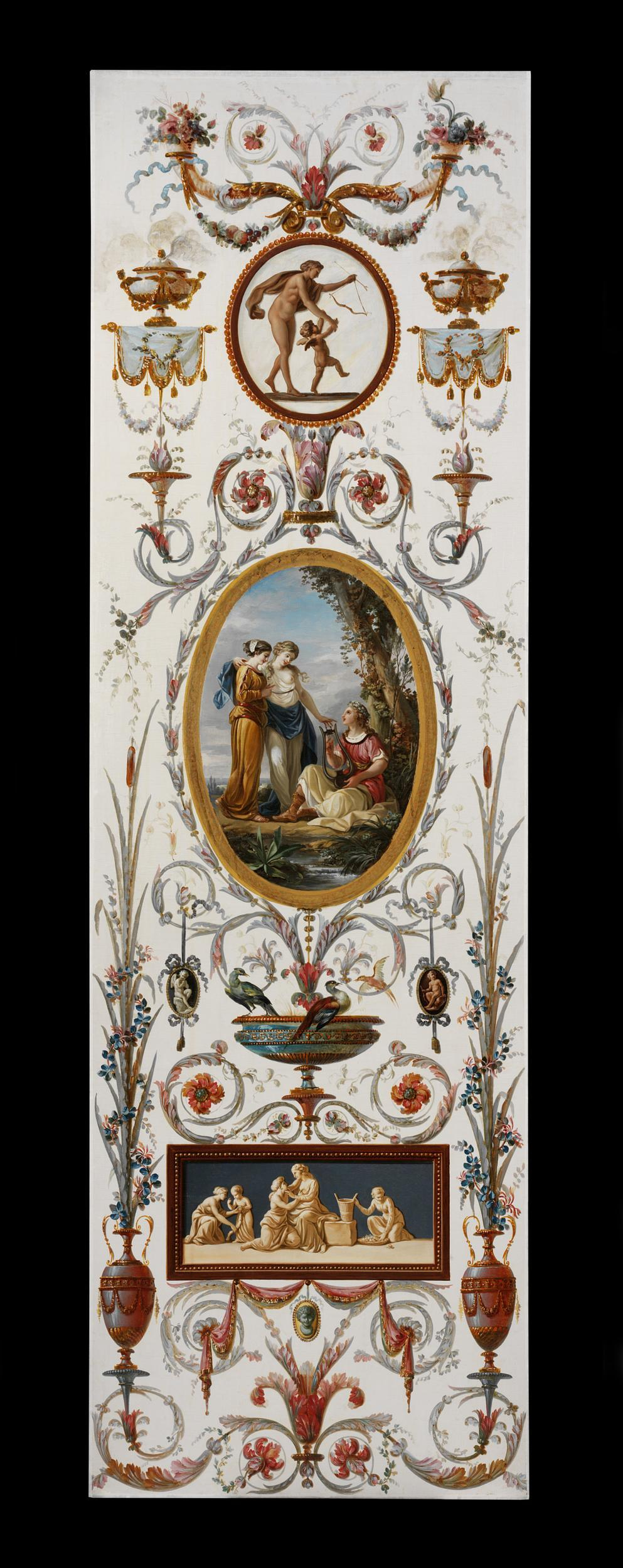
Panel depicting an incident from the life of Achilles, 1770s, Victoria and Albert Museum

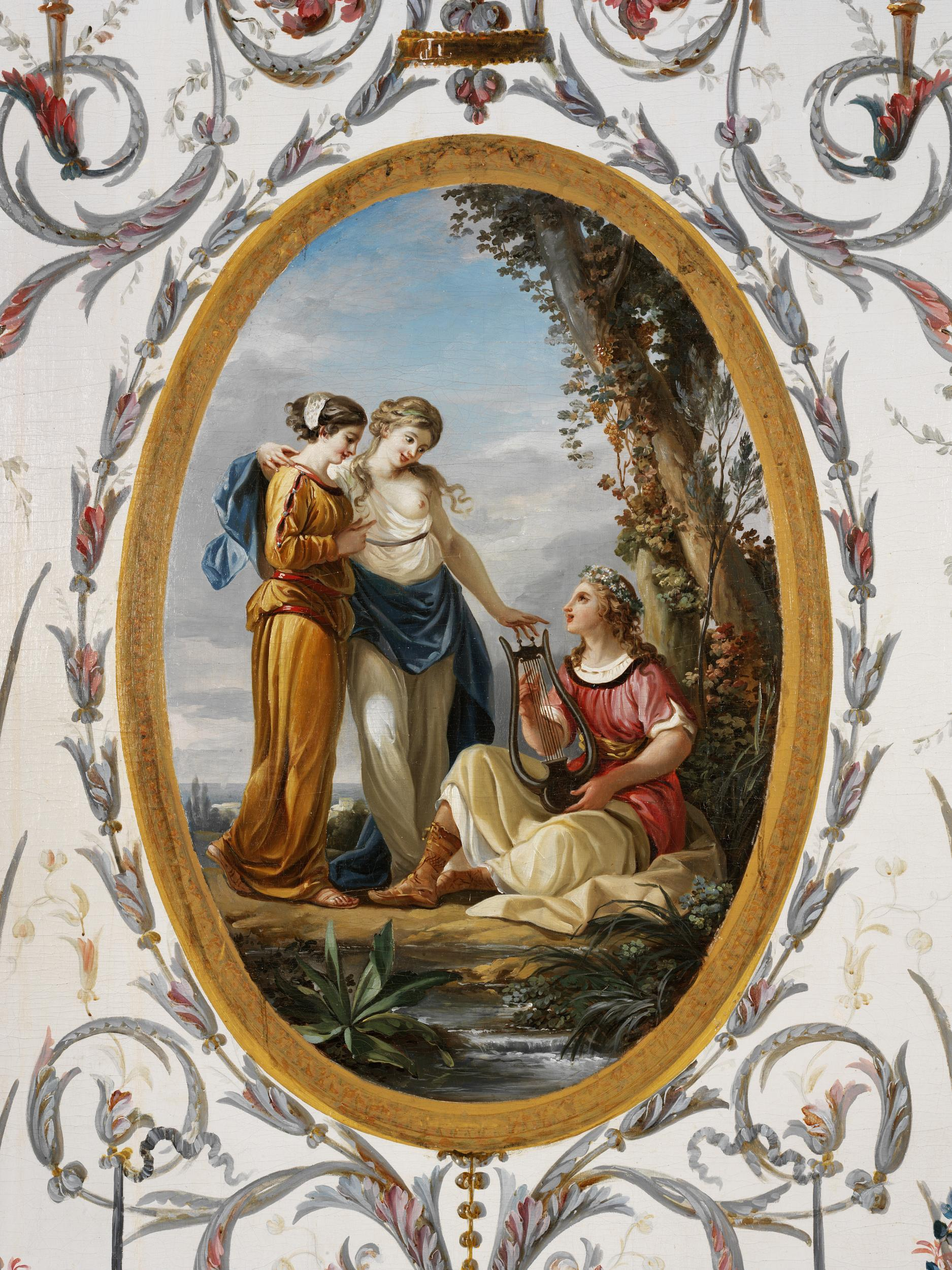
Detail from a panel depicting an incident from the life of Achilles, 1770s, Victoria and Albert Museum

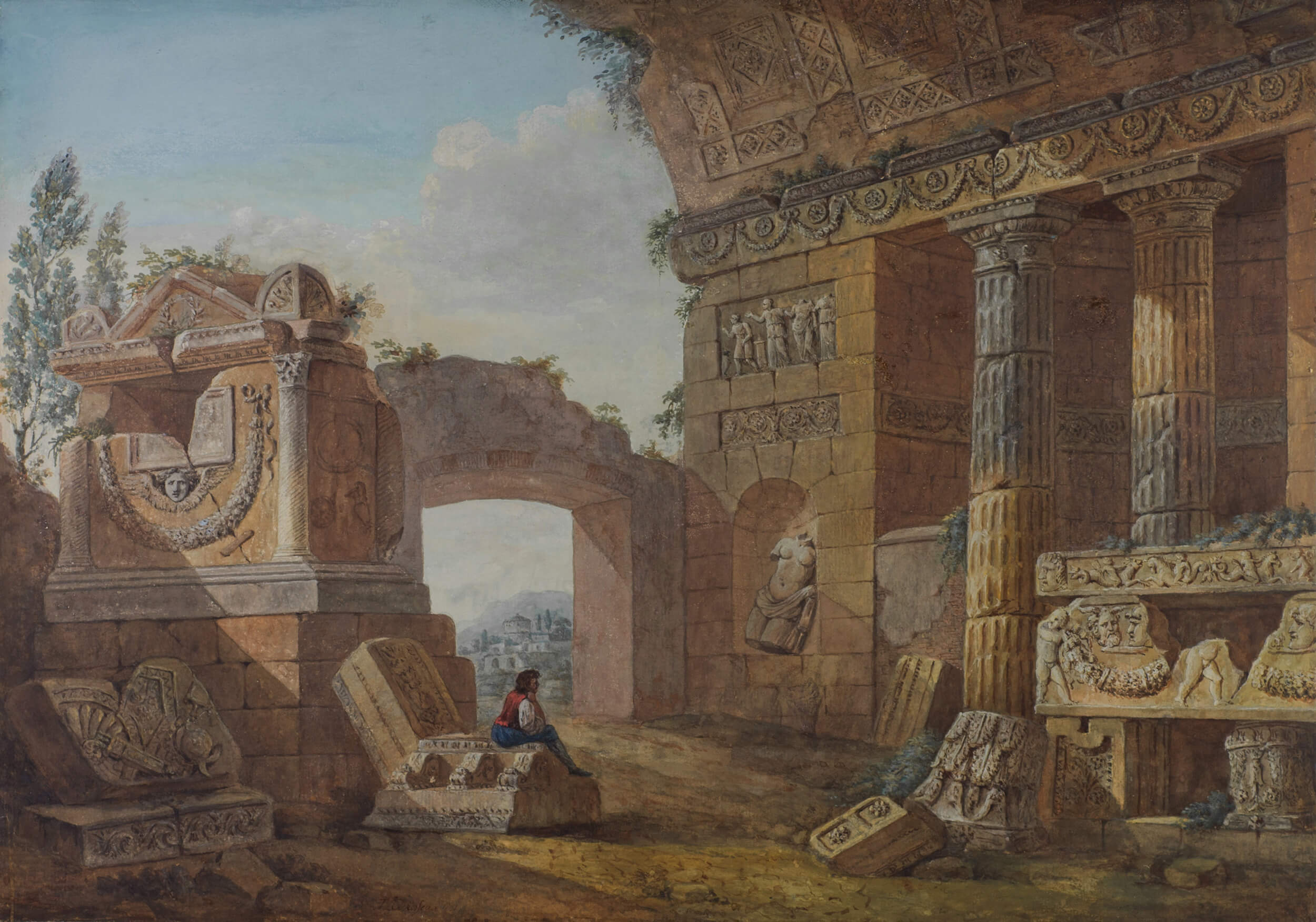
Capriccio of a temple (1781), private collection

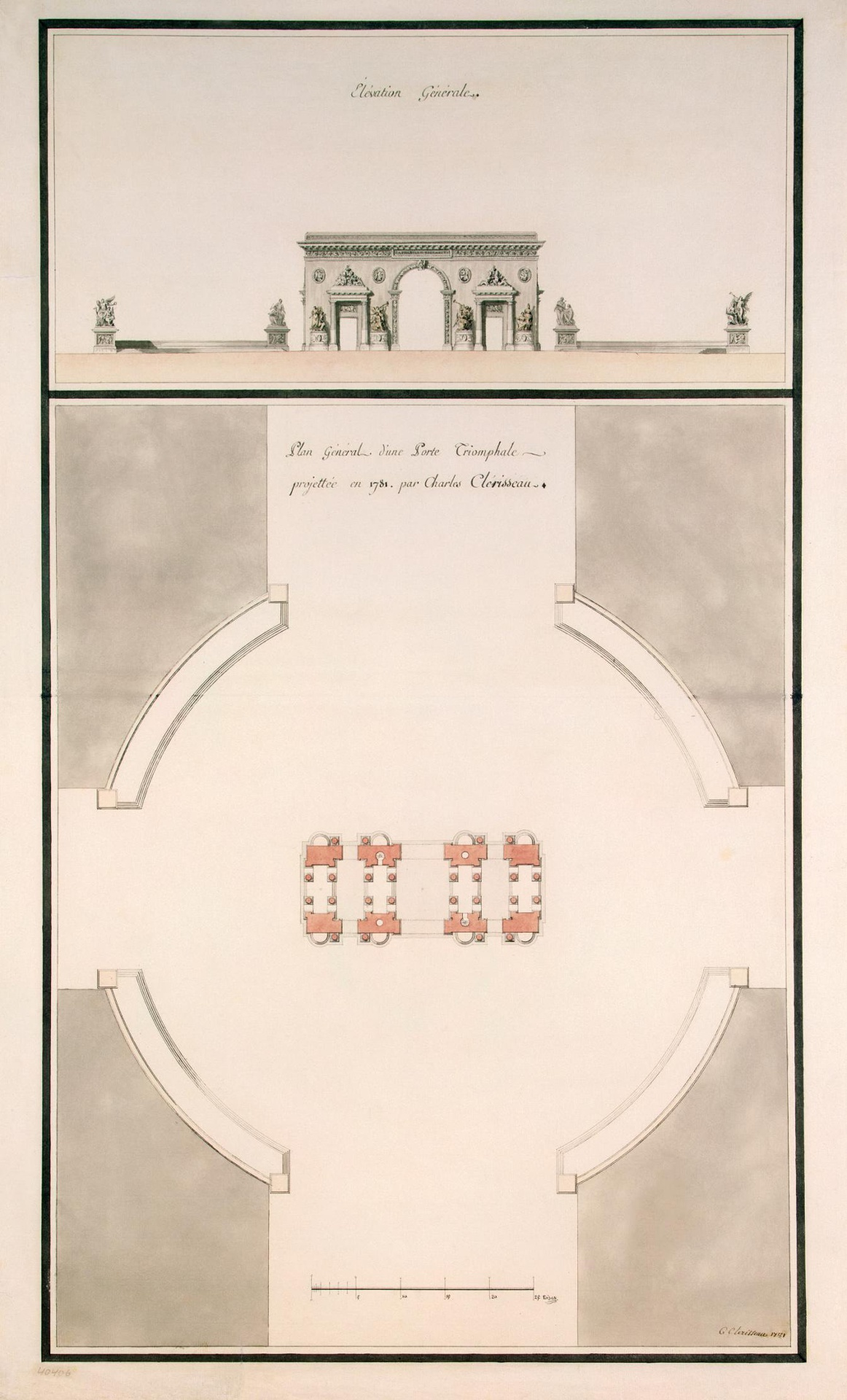
Project of a Triumphal Arch for Catherine the Great (1781), Hermitage

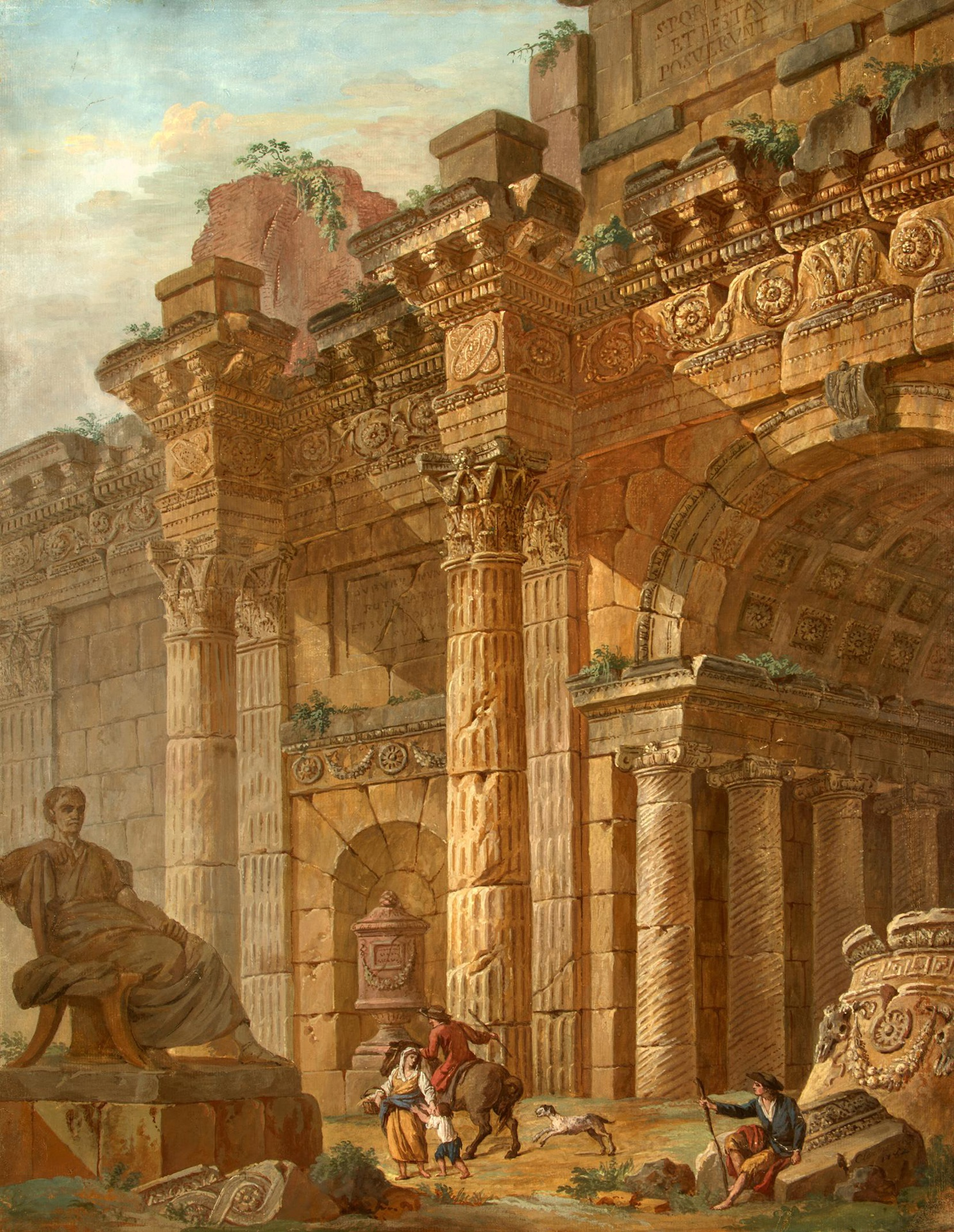
Architectural fantasy (1782), Hermitage

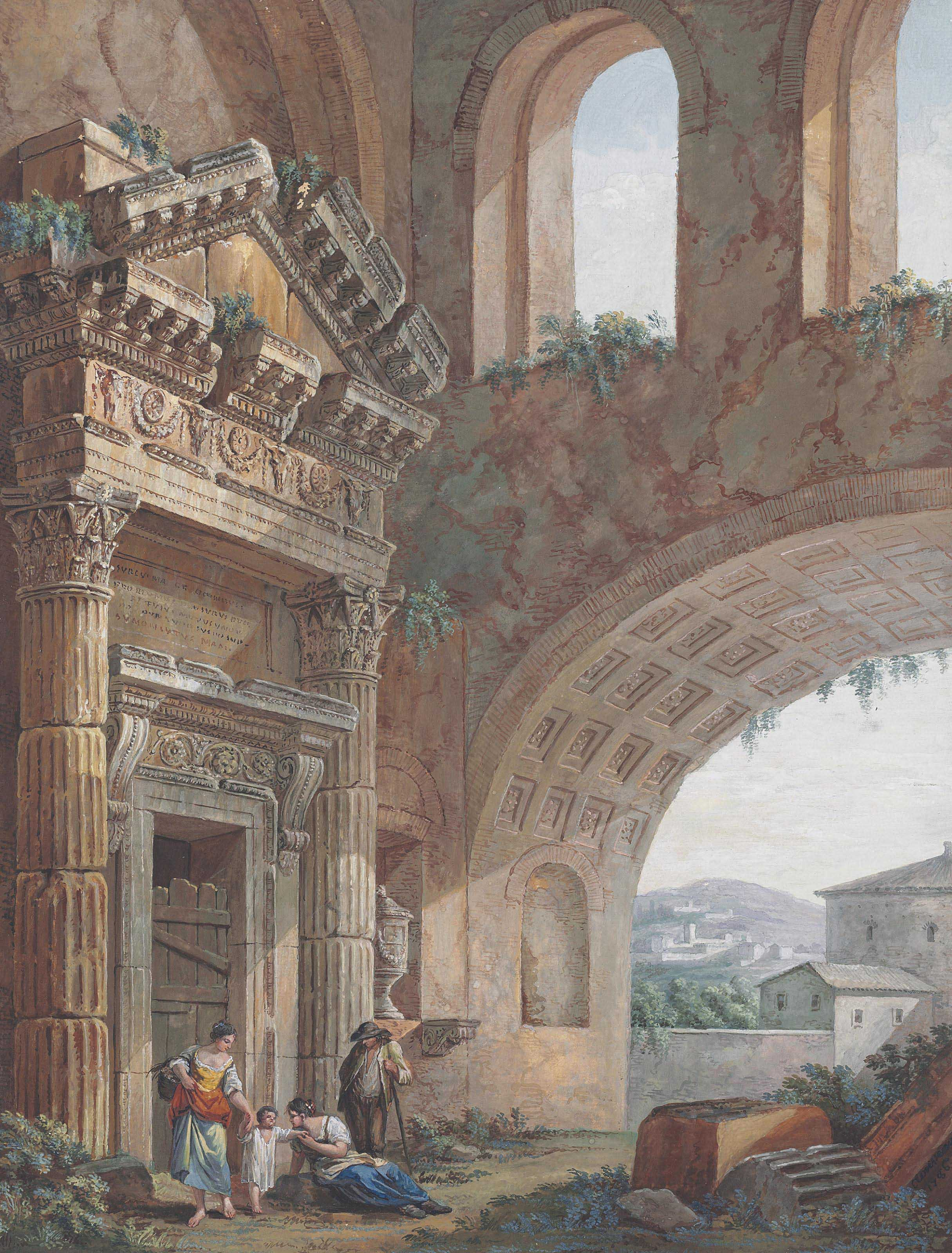
Capriccio with figures by a great arch (1786), private collection.

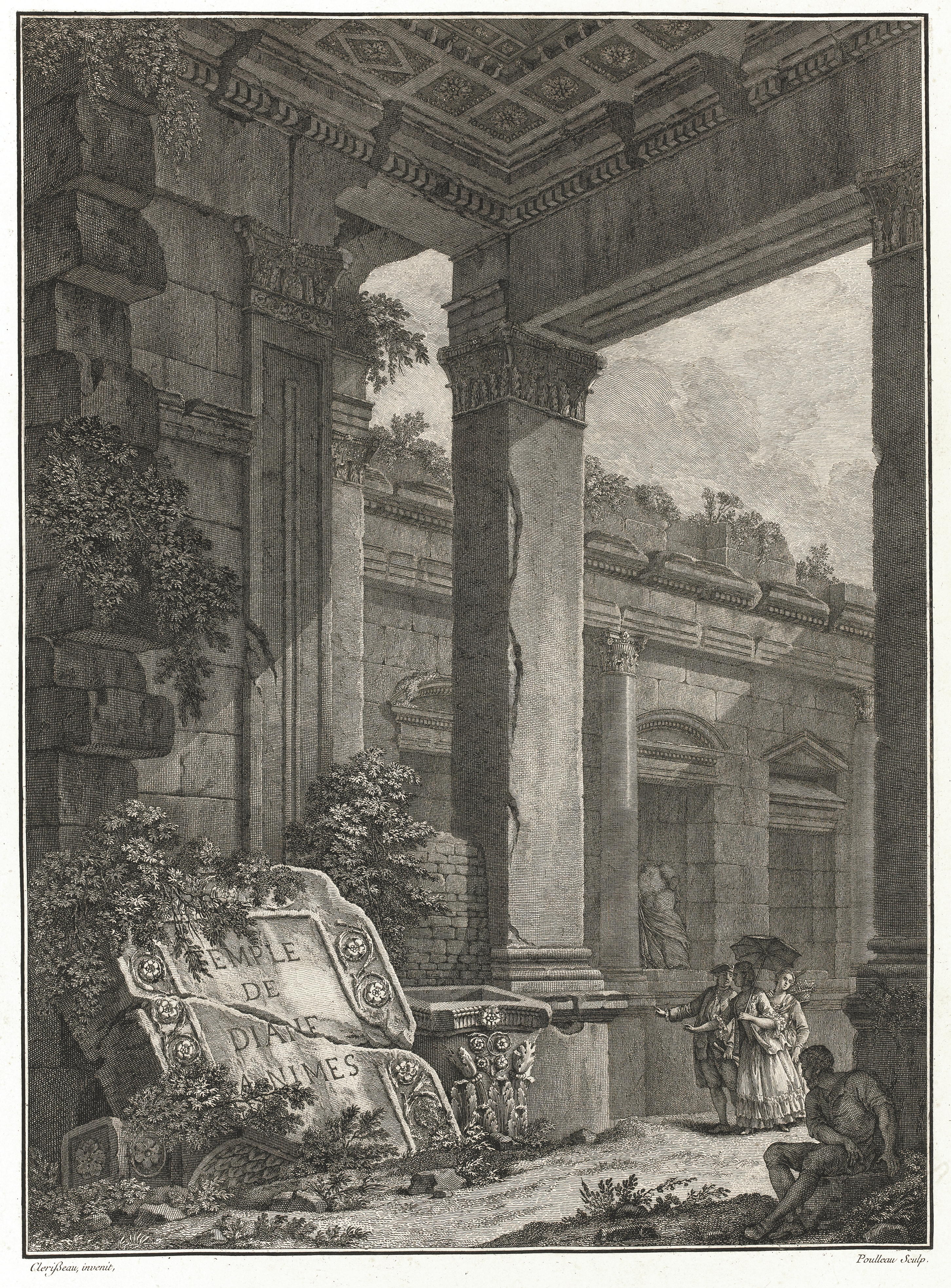
Ruins of the Temple of Diana at Nîmes, etching by Poulleau from Antiquités de la France (1788)

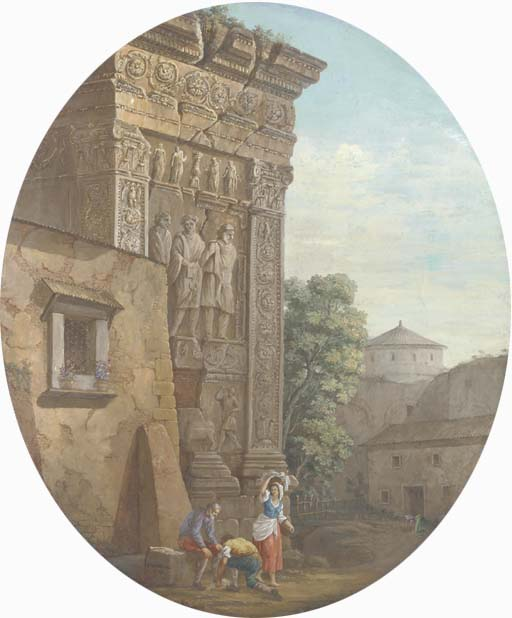
Arch of the Argentieri in Rome with figures in foreground (1789), private collection.

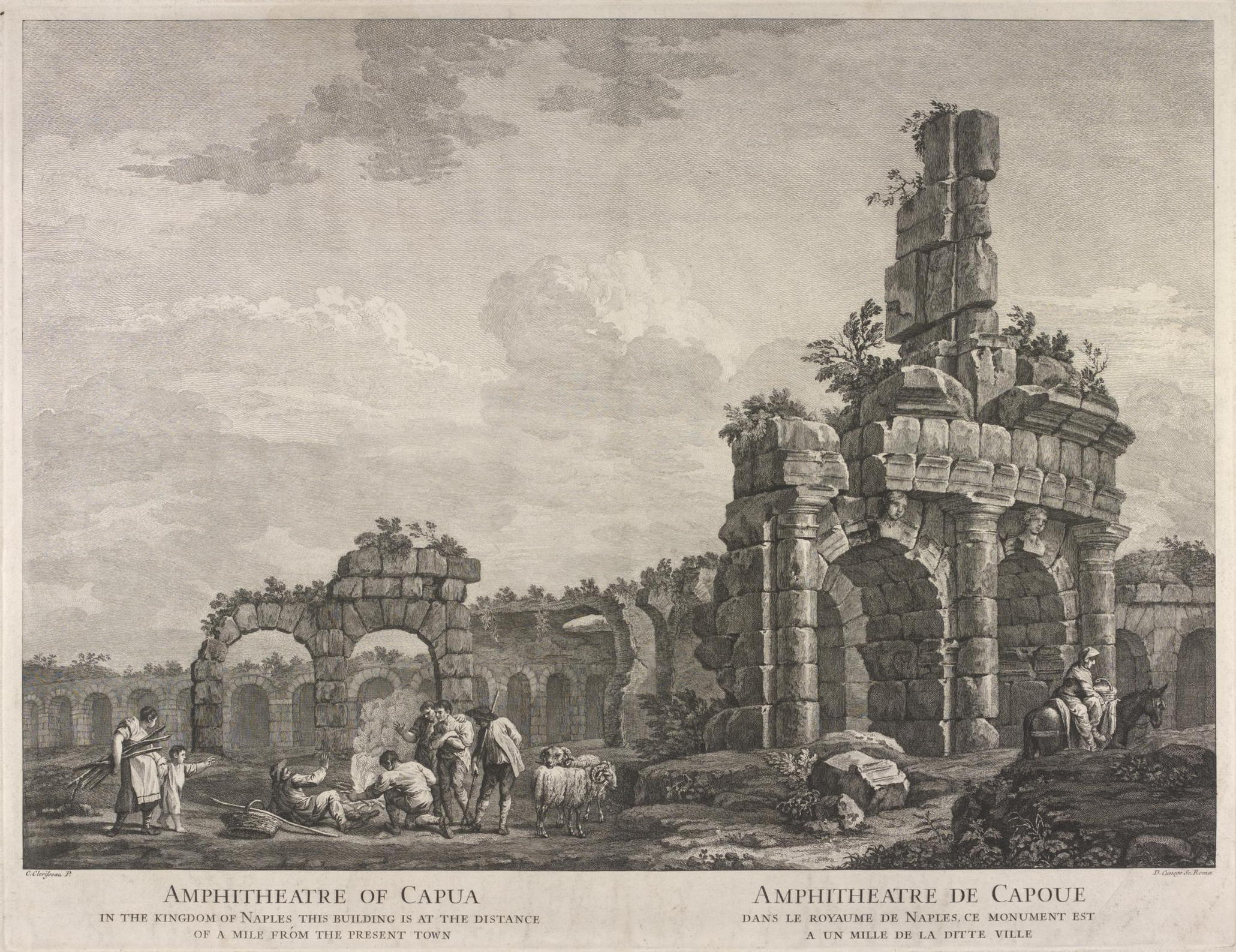
Domenico Cunego after Clérisseau, etching of the Amphitheatre of Capua (before 1794), Victoria and Albert Museum

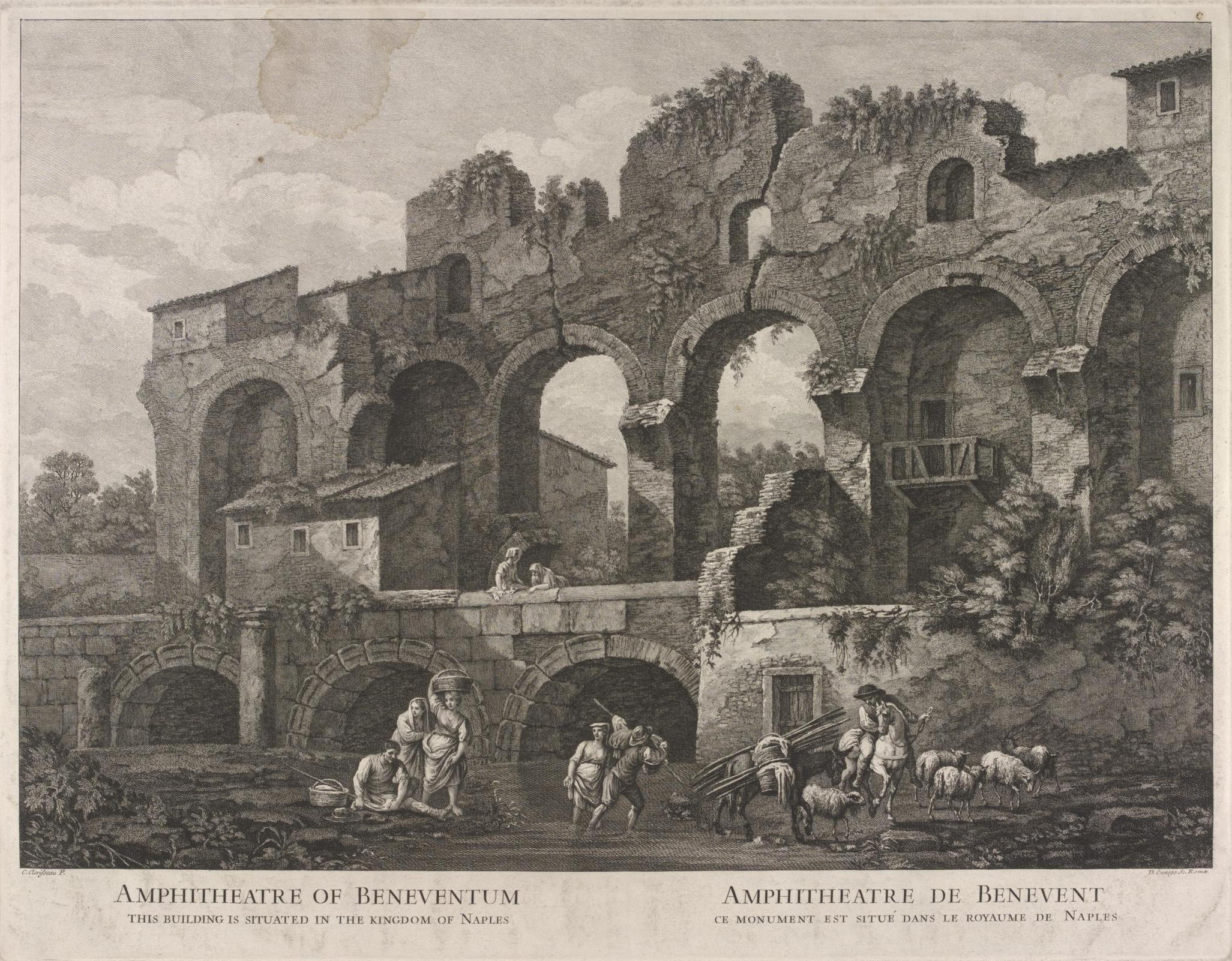
Domenico Cunego after Clérisseau, etching of the Amphitheatre of Benventum (before 1794), Victoria and Albert Museum

== Gallery (undated works) ==
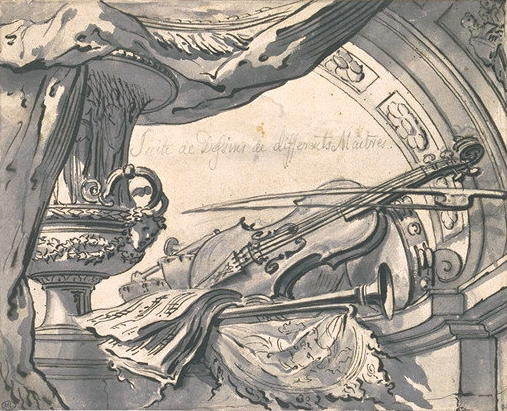
Allegory of Music, n.d., Louvre

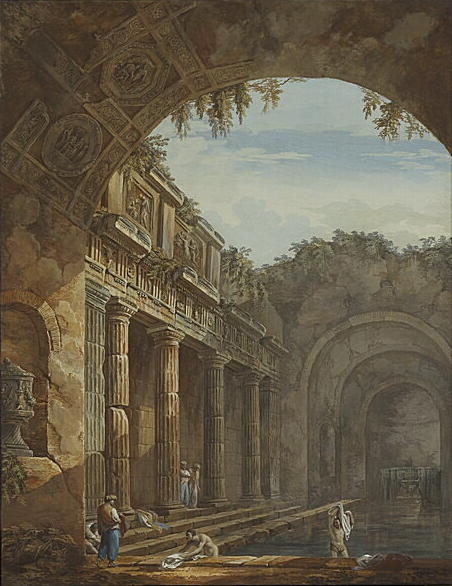
Baths in ruins, n.d., Louvre

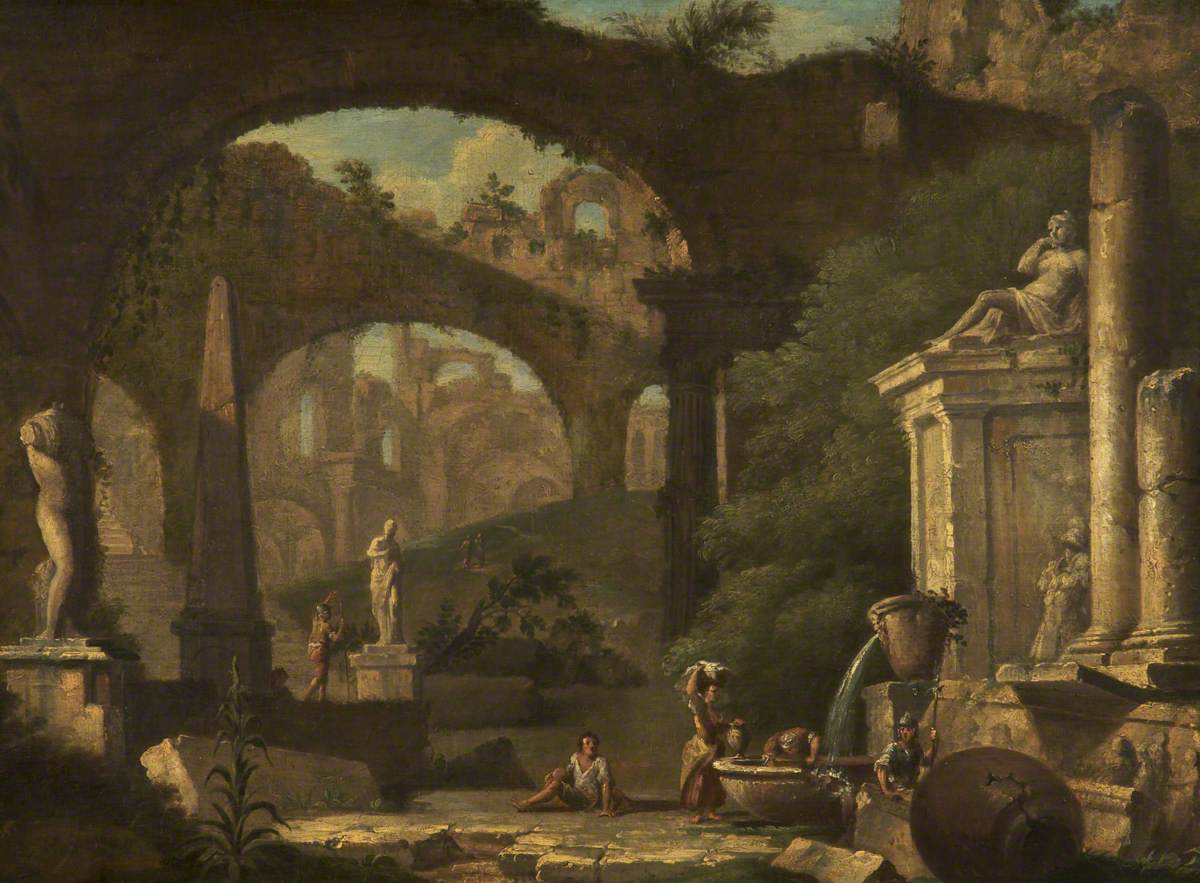
Capriccio with Classical ruins, n.d., Whitworth Art Gallery, University of Manchester

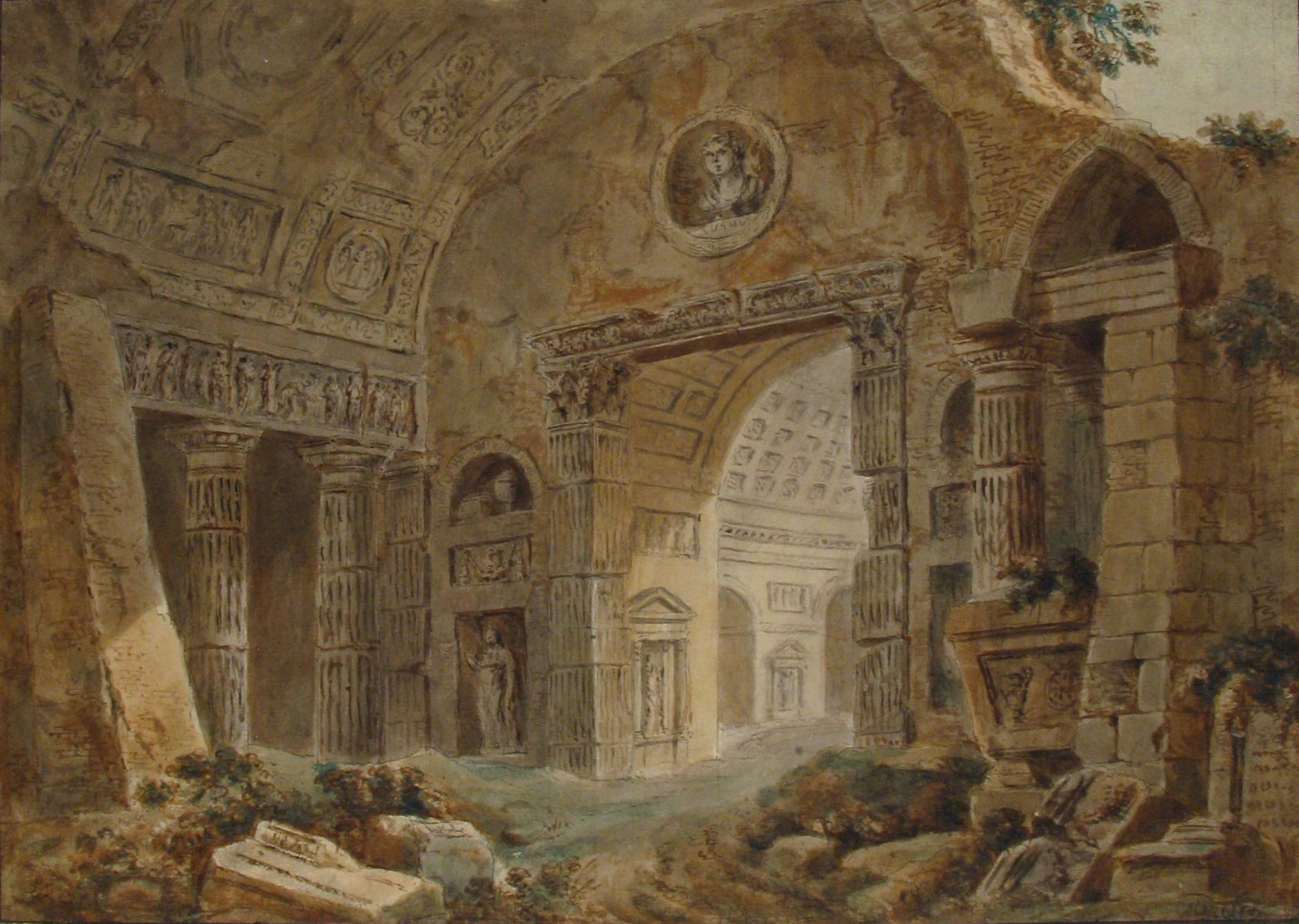
Architectural fantasy with Roman ruins, n.d., Metropolitan Museum of Art

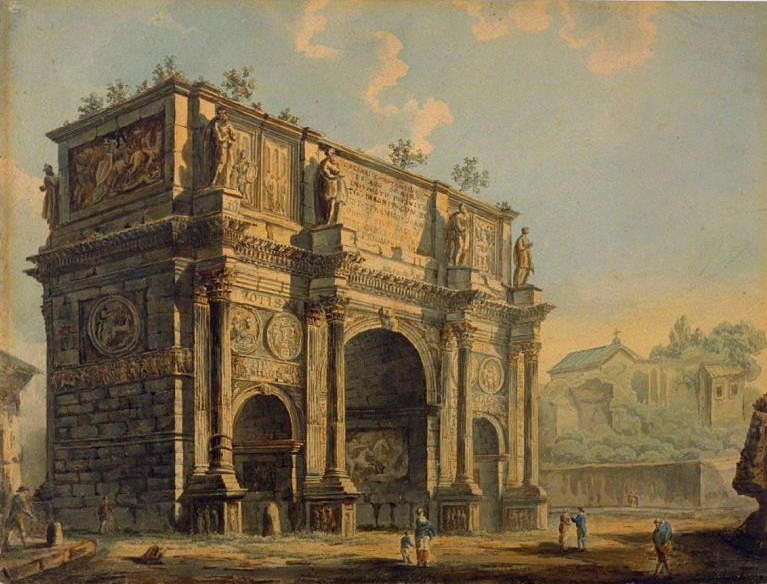
Arch of Constantine, n.d., Legion of Honor, San Francisco

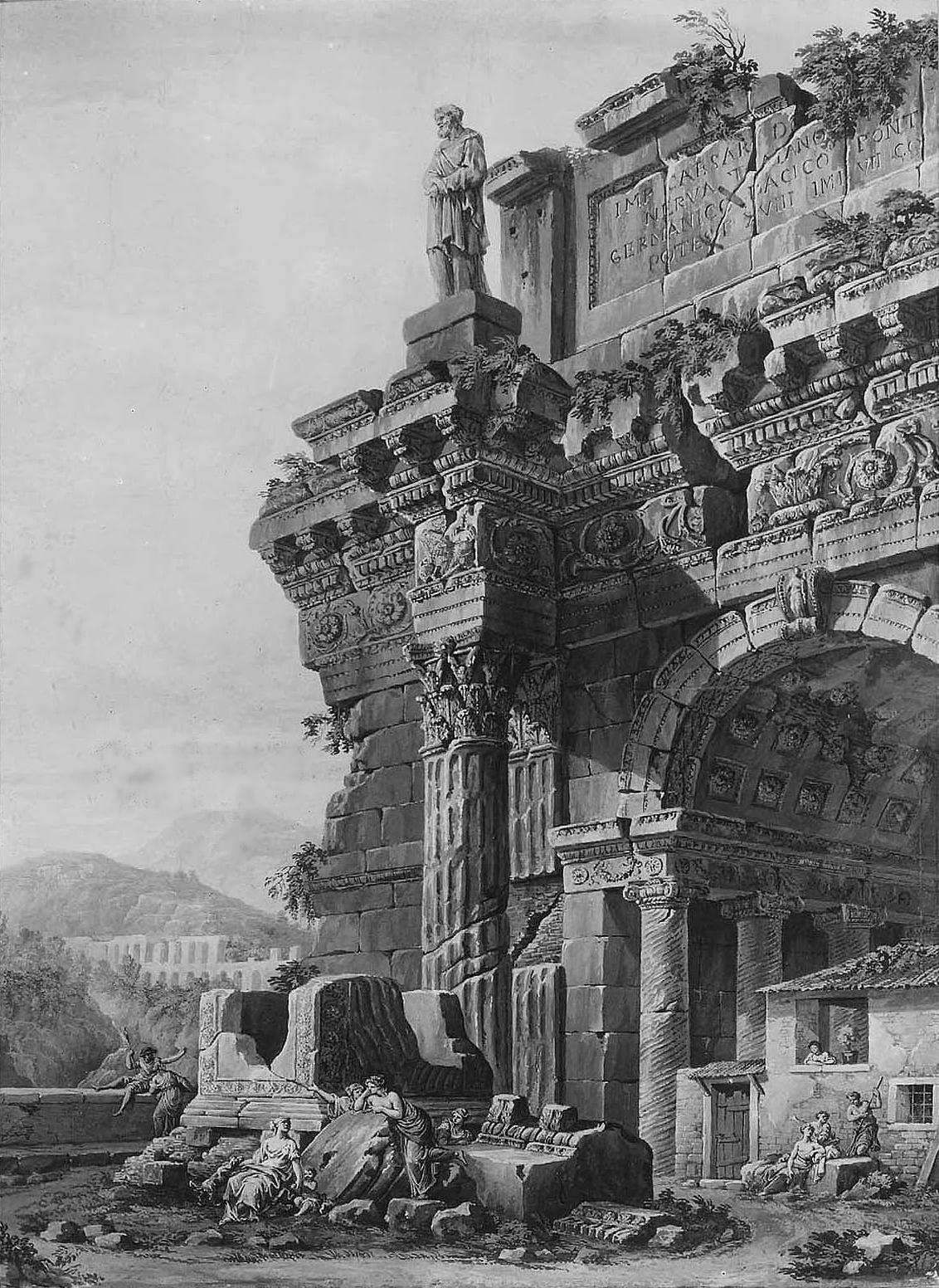
Ruins of a Roman arch, n.d., Museum of Fine Arts, Boston

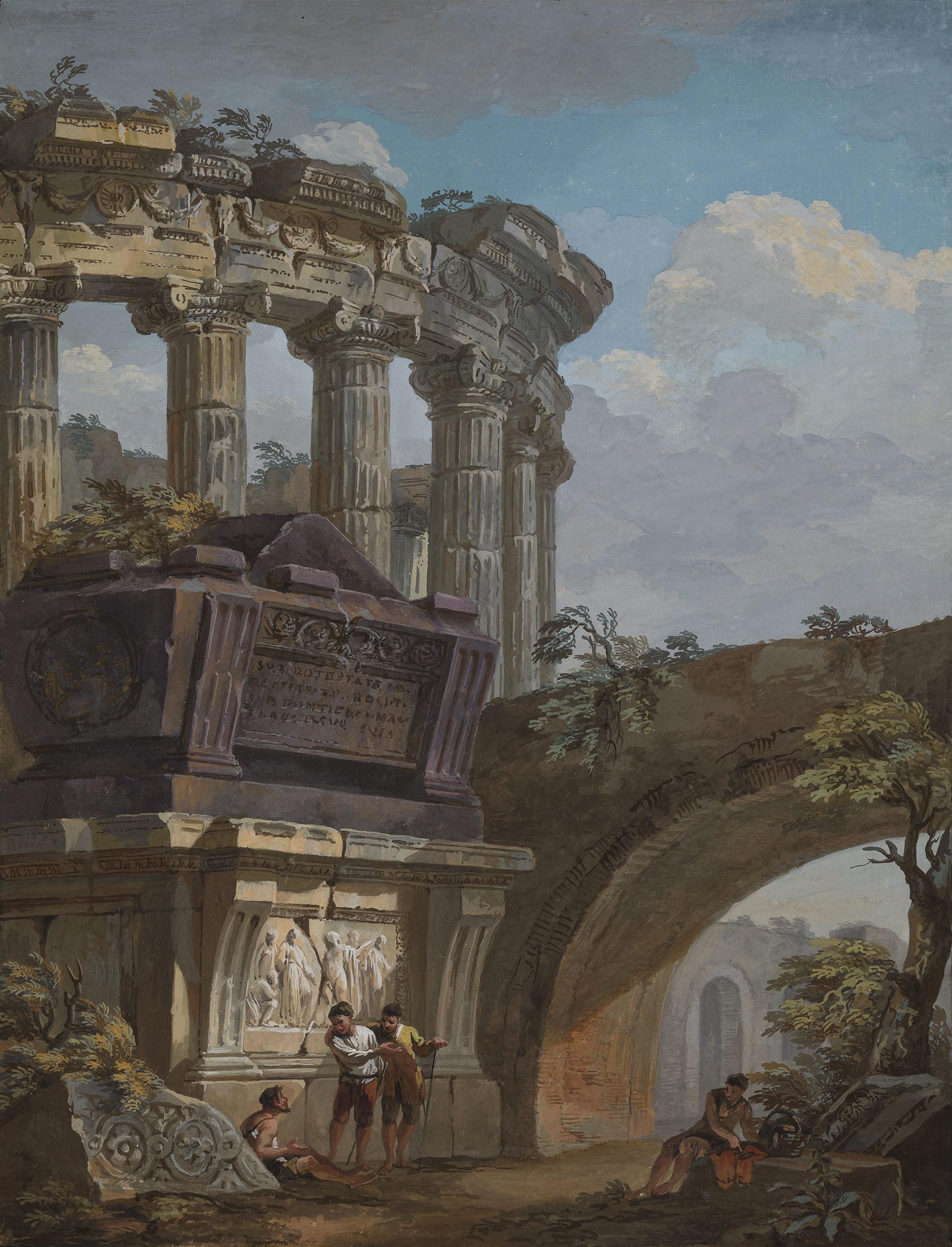
Roman ruins, n.d., Royal Collection Trust

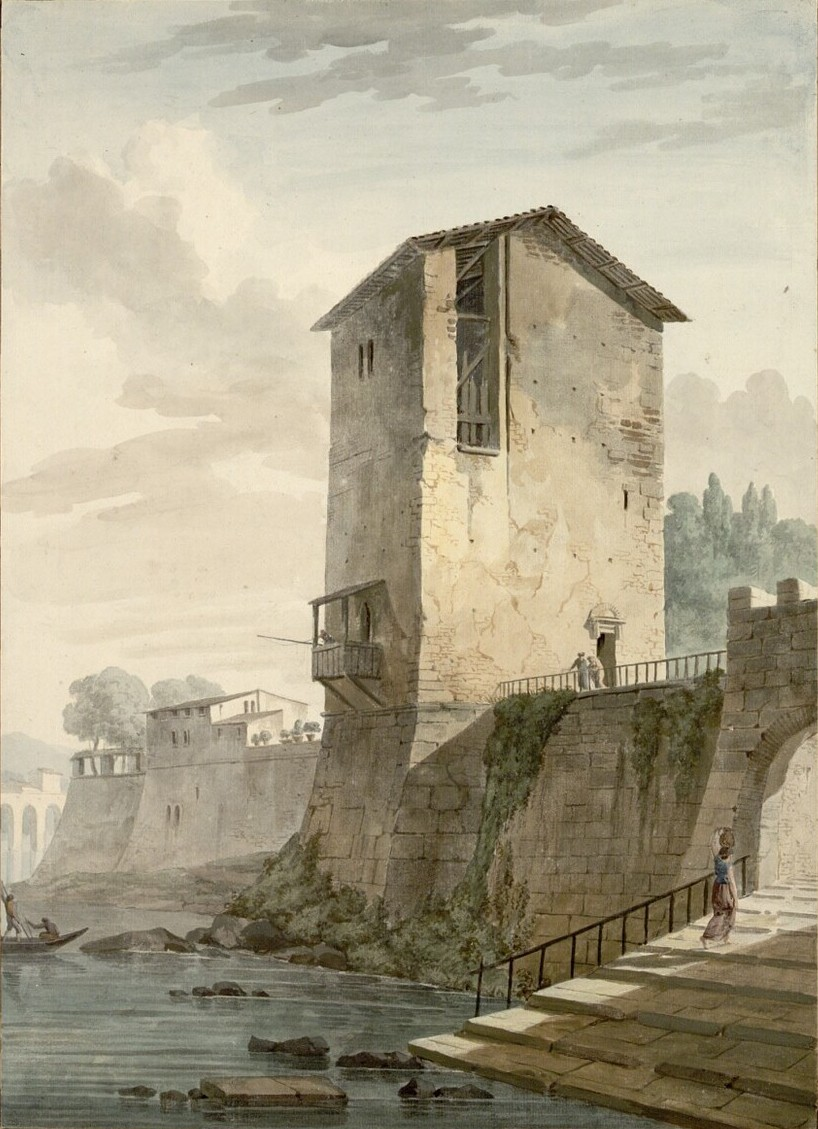
Building on the banks of the Tiber, n.d., Albertina, Vienna

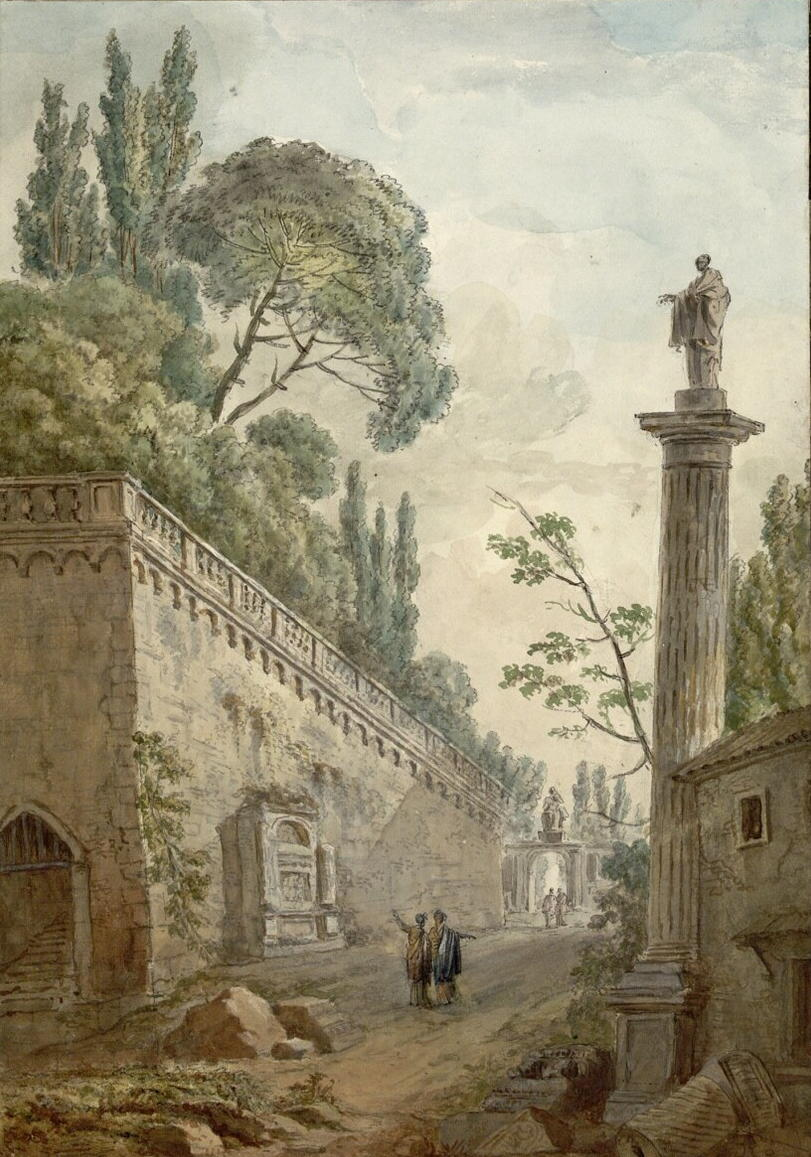
Landscape with a path, garden wall and column, n.d., Albertina, Vienna

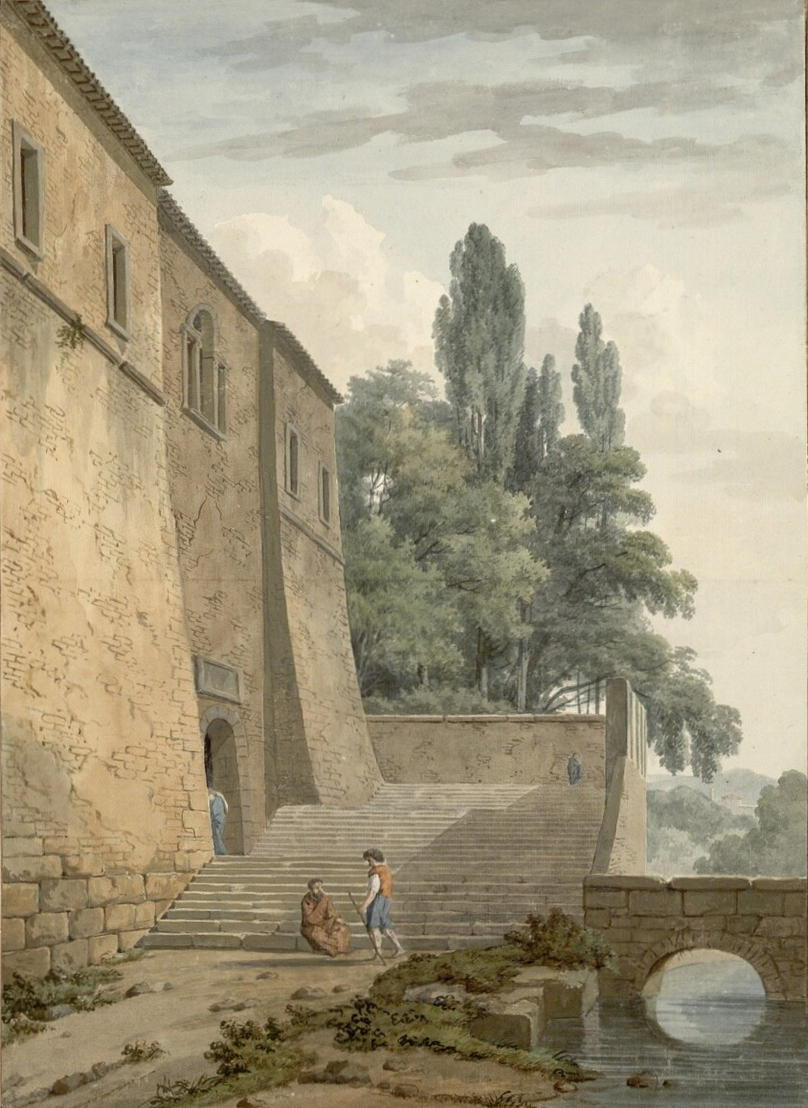
Staircase of Castel Gandolfo near Rome, n.d., Albertina, Vienna

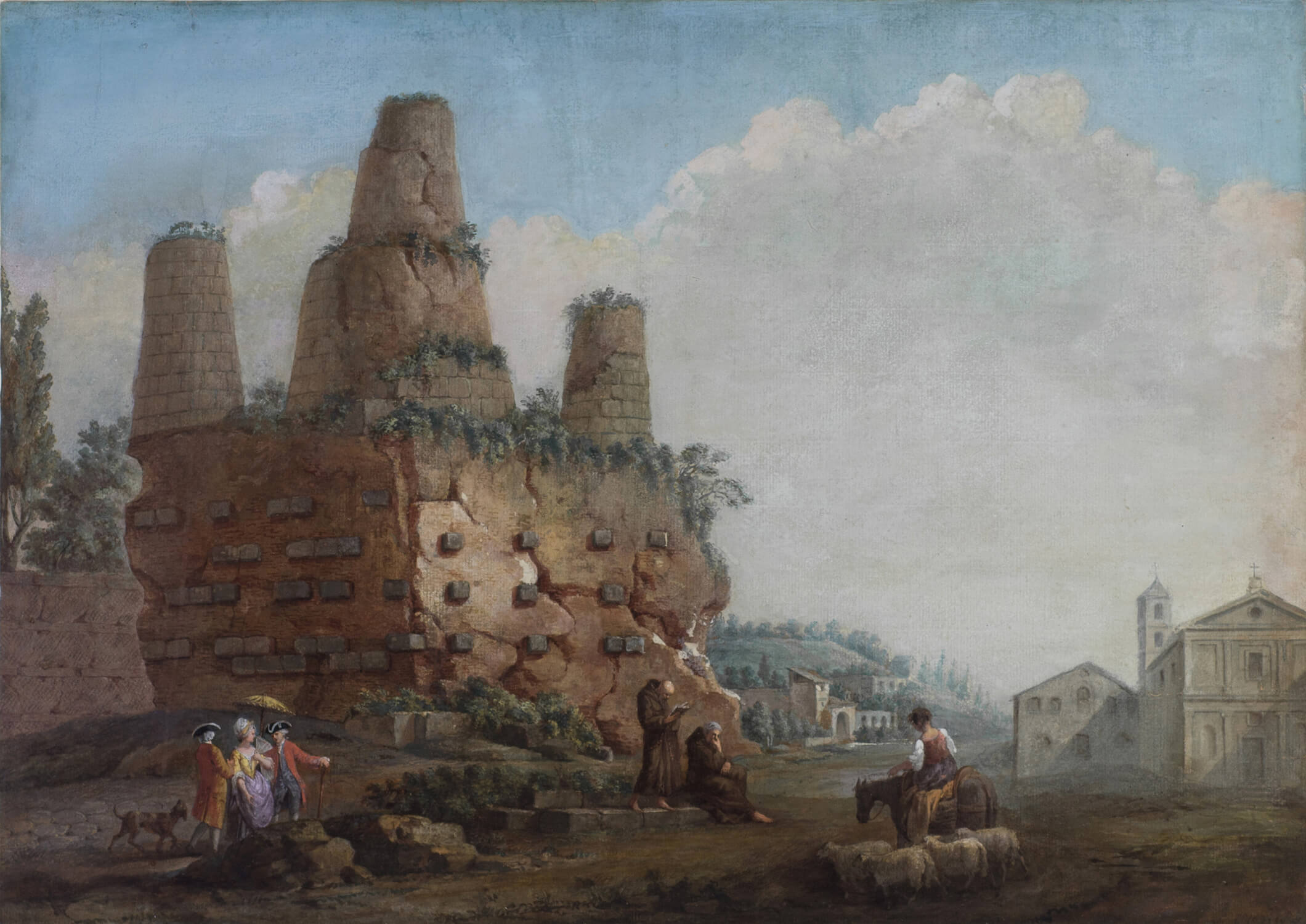
Tomb of the Curiatii and Horatii on the Appian Way, n.d., private collection

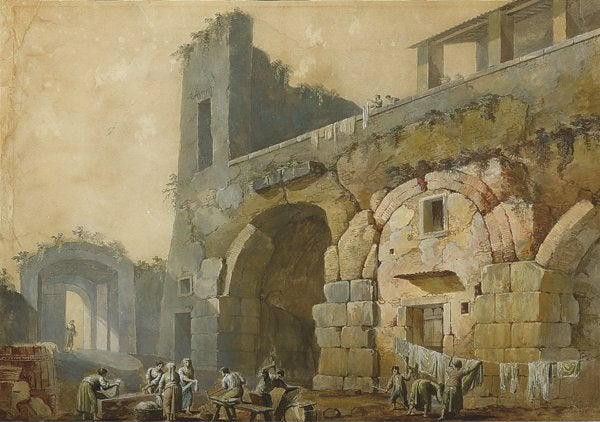
Flavian Amphitheater in Pozzuoli, n.d., private collection.

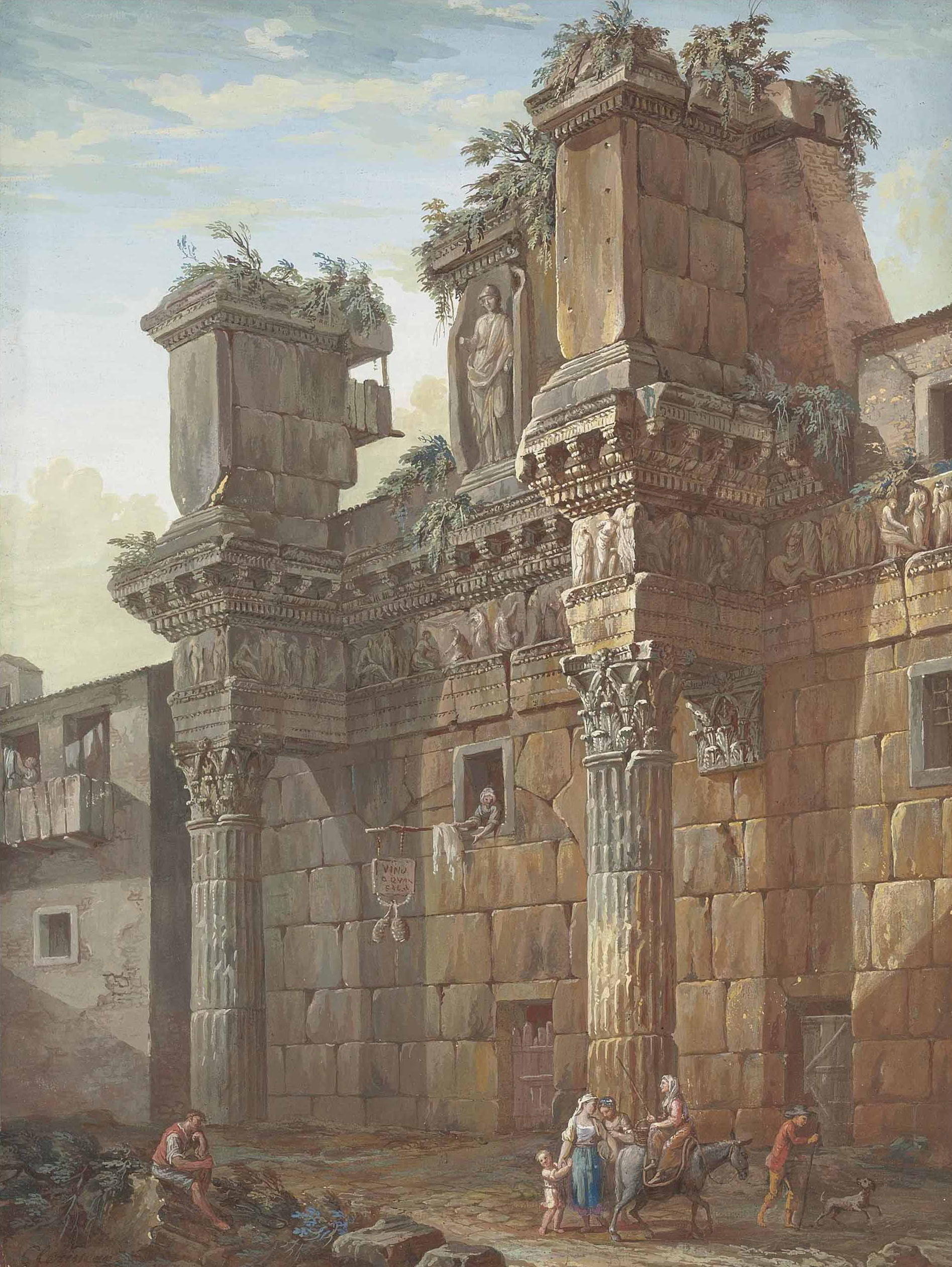
Forum of Nerva in Rome, n.d., private collection.

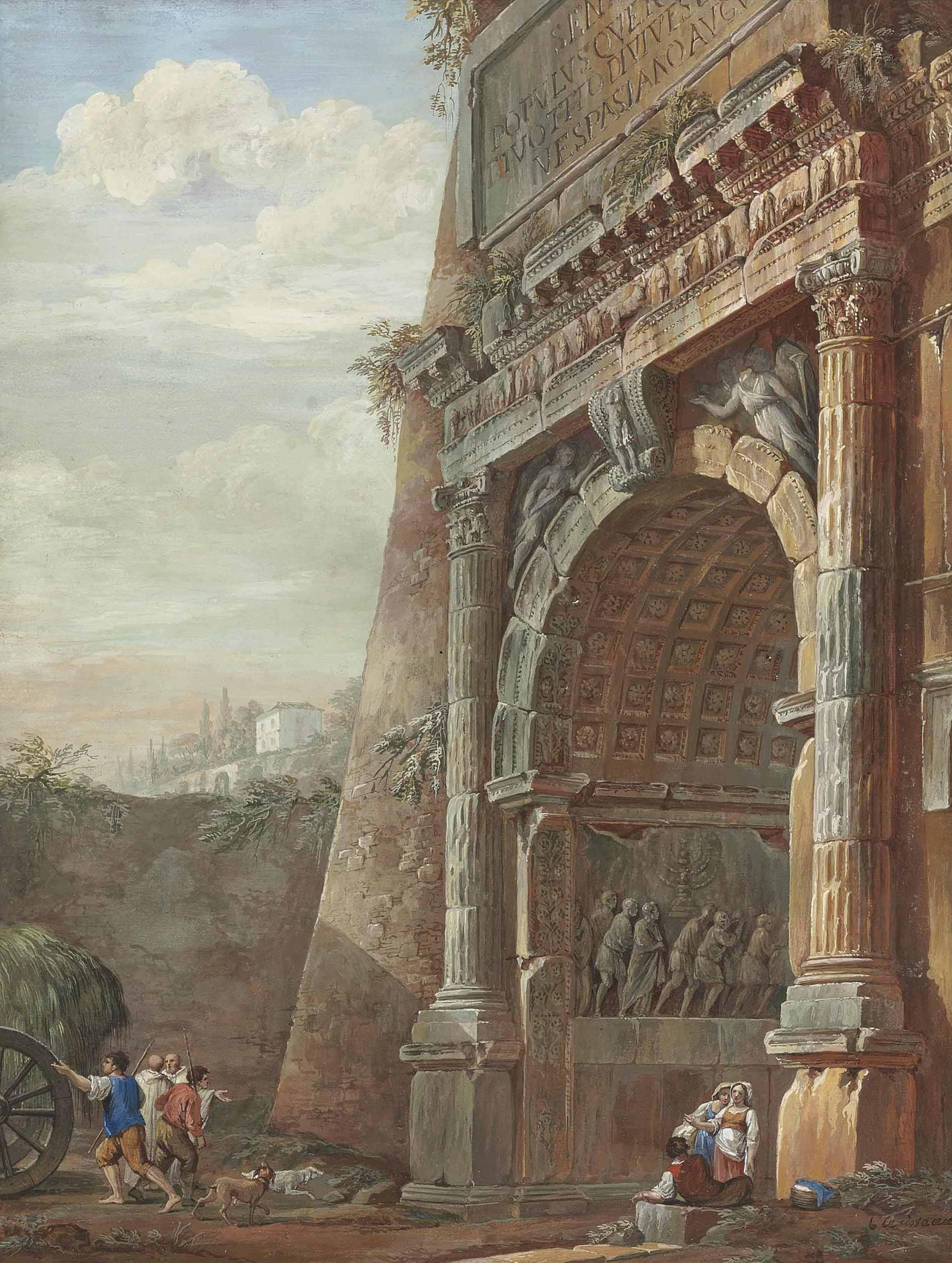
Arch of Titus in Rome, n.d., private collection.

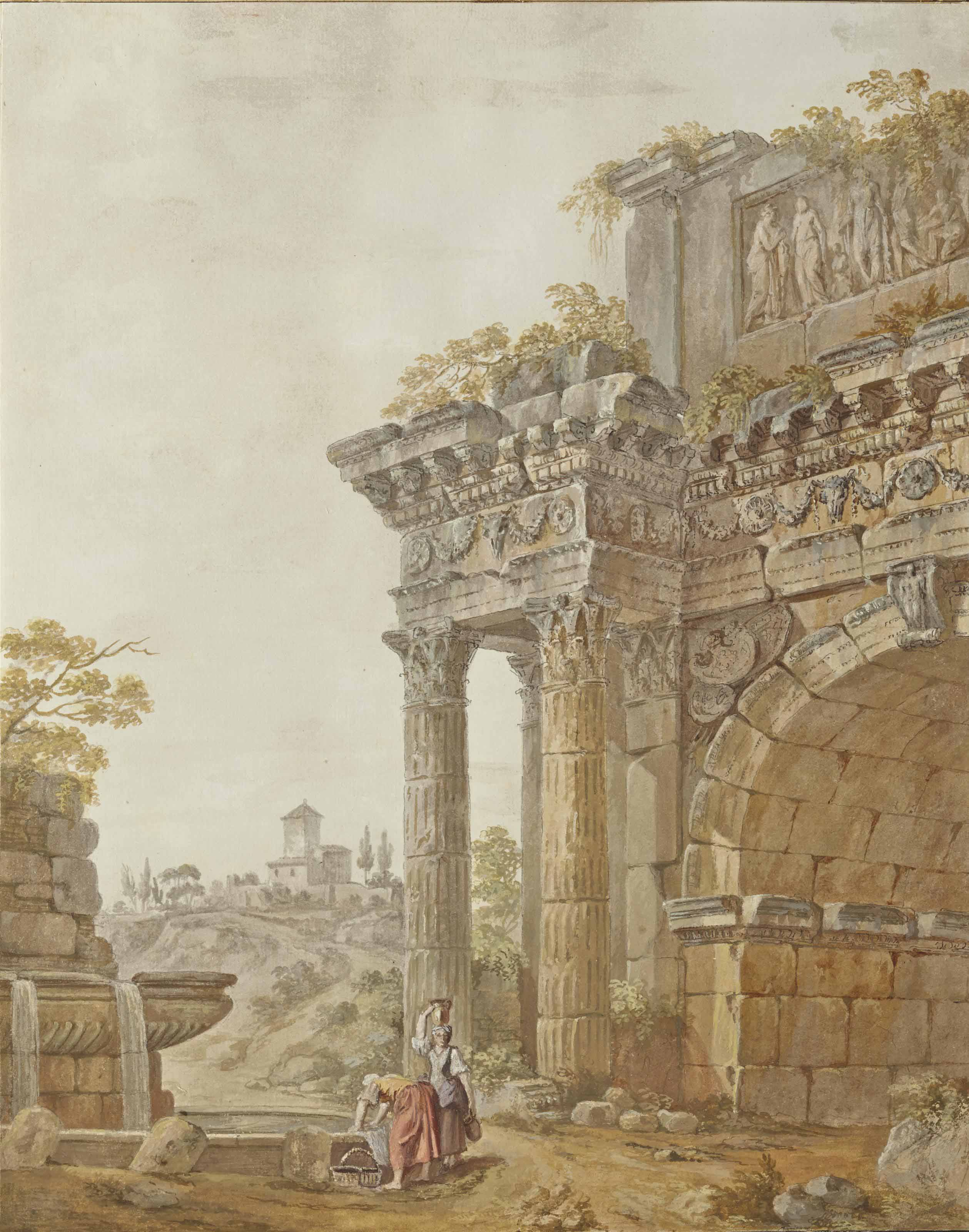
Women at a fountain amid ruins, n.d., private collection.

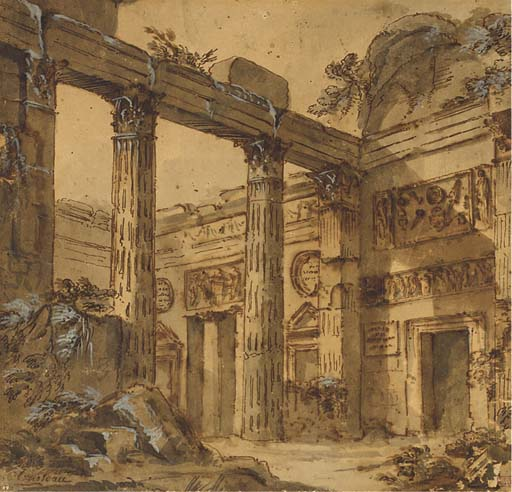
Architectural fantasy, n.d., private collection.

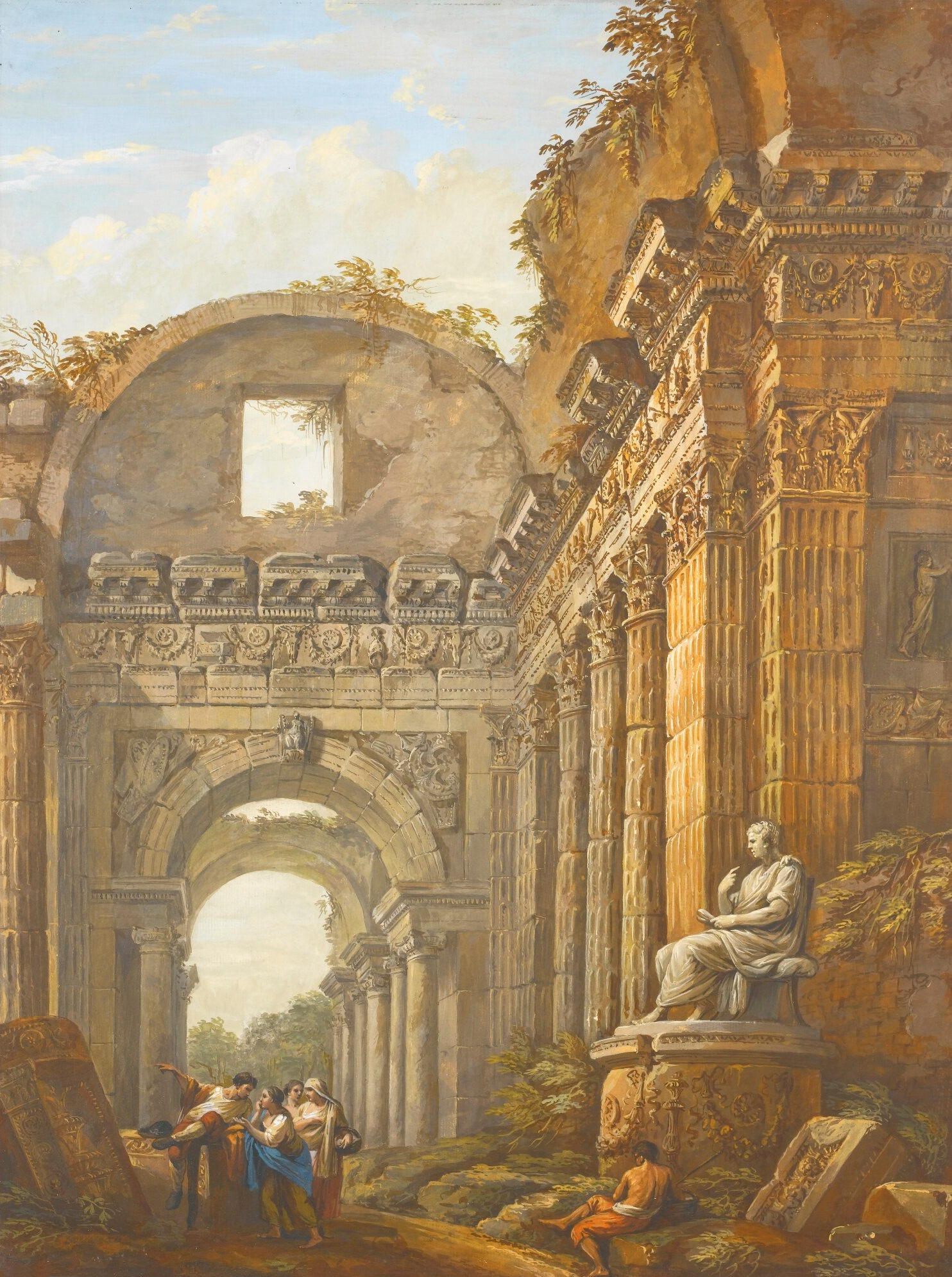
Capriccio of Roman ruins with figures in the foregound, n.d., private collection

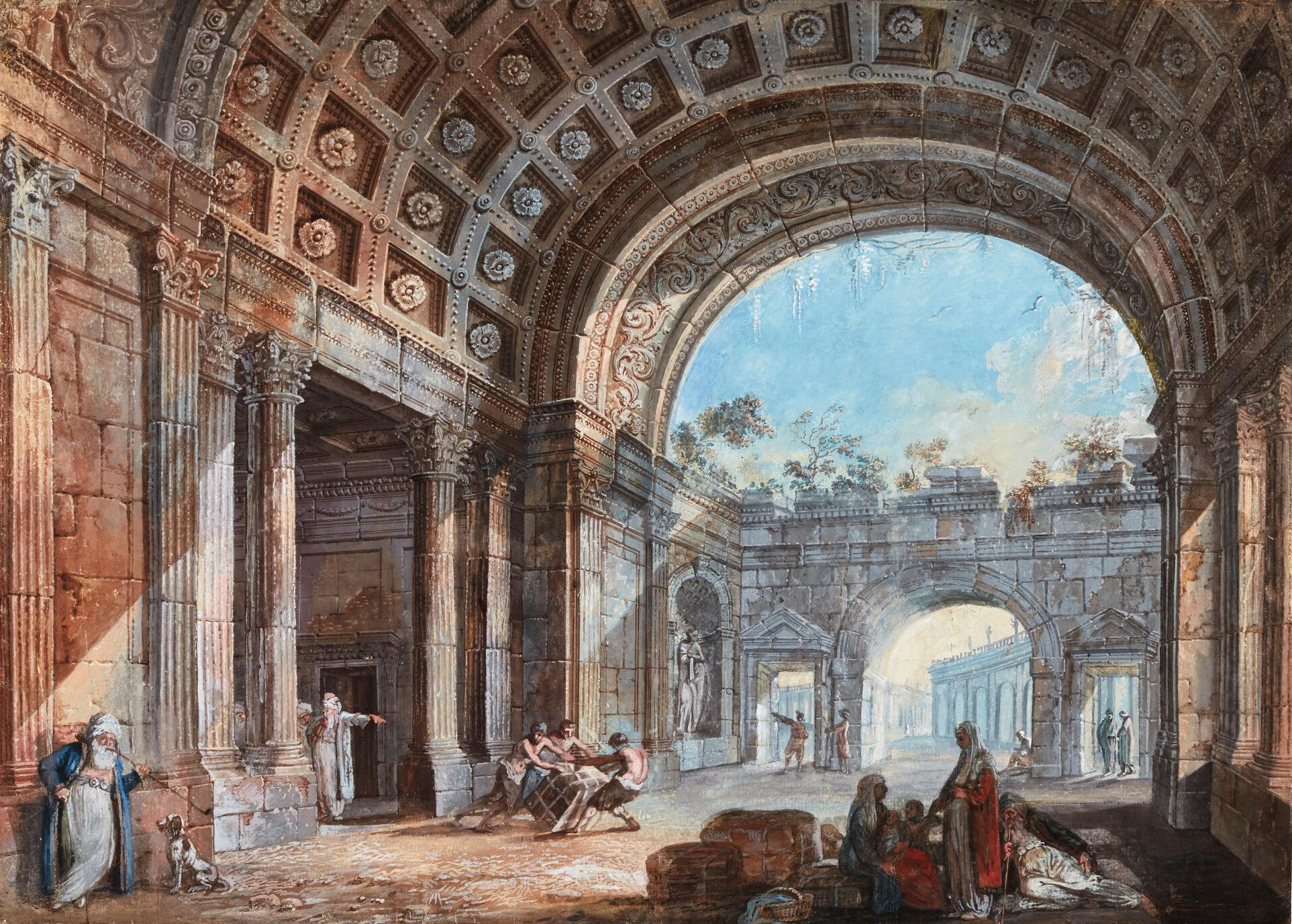
Roman ruins with oriental staffage, n.d., private collection

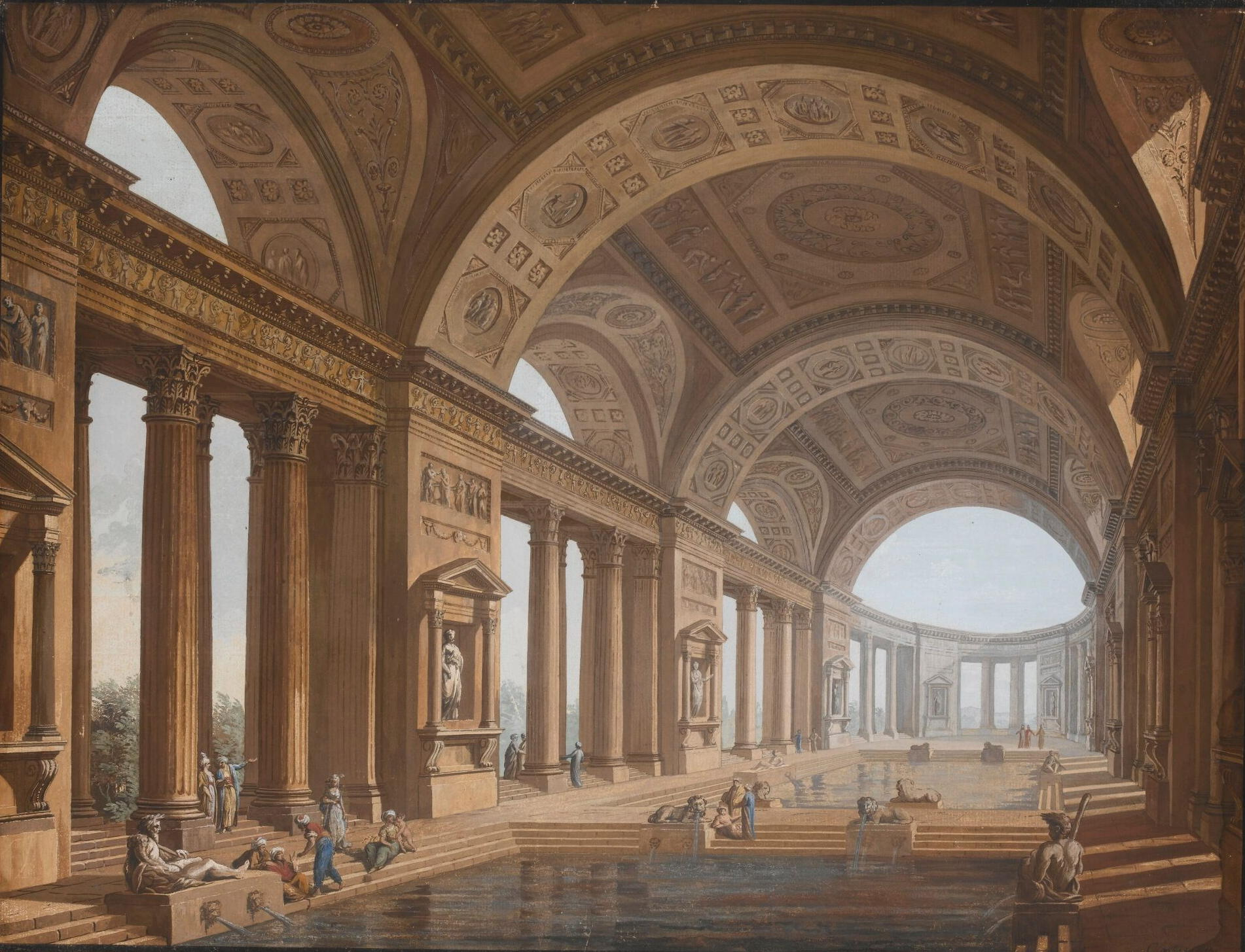
View of the interior of an antique Roman bath, n.d., private collection

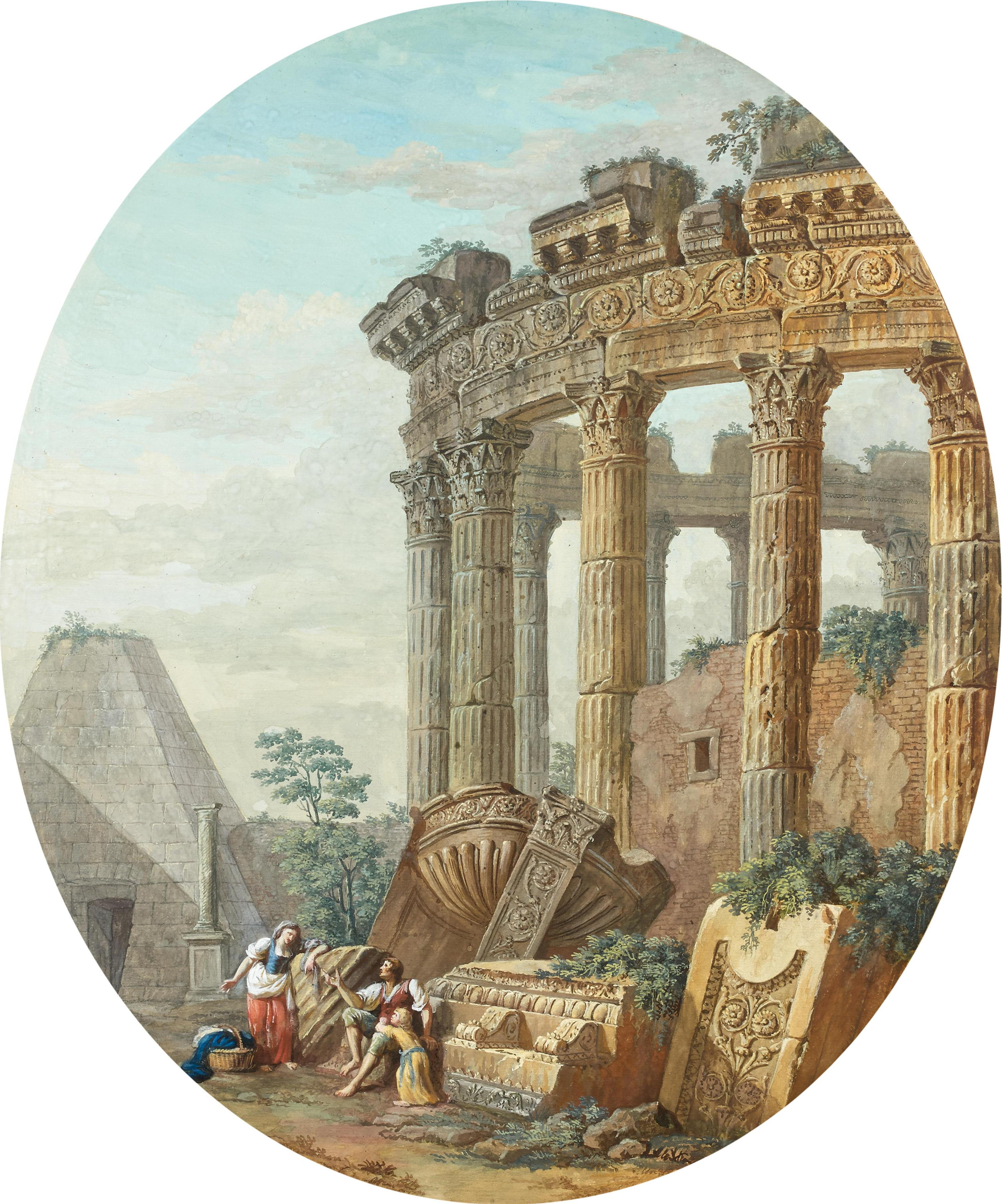
Figures in a capriccio, n.d., private collection

== Sources ==
- Adam, Robert. Ruins of the Palace of the Emperor Diocletian at Spalatro in Dalmatia. London: Printed for the Author, 1764.
- Bellier de La Chavignerie, Émile; Auvray, Louis. "Clérisseau (Charles-Louis) entry in Dictionnaire général des artistes de l'École française depuis l'origine des arts du dessin jusqu'à nos jours: architectes, peintres, sculpteurs, graveurs et lithographes. Paris: 1882-1885, vol. I, p. 465.
- Charles-Louis Clérisseau (1721-1820): Dessins du Musée de l'Ermitage, Saint-Pétersbourg [Exposition, Musée du Louvre, du 21 Septembre au 18 Décembre 1995], Paris: Editions de la Réunion des Musées Nationaux, 1995.
- Clérisseau, Charles-Louis (1778). Antiquités de la France, Prèmiere partie: Monumens de Nismes. Paris: P.D. Pièrres.
- Fleming, John (1962). Robert Adam and His Circle, in Edinburgh & Rome.
- Eustace, Katherine. "Robert Adam, Charles-Louis Clérisseau, Michael Rysbrack and the Hopetoun Chimneypiece", The Burlington Magazine, Vol. 139, No. 1136 (Nov., 1997), pp. 743-752.
- Gallet, Michel (1995). Les architectes parisiens du XVIIIe siècle. Paris: Editions Mengès. pp. 127–134. ISBN 2-85620-370-1.
- Hafertepe, Kenneth. "An Inquiry into Thomas Jefferson's Ideas of Beauty", Journal of the Society of Architectural Historians, Vol. 59, No. 2 (June, 2000), pp. 216-231.
- Hopkinson, Martin. "Cunego's Engravings after Gavin Hamilton", Print Quarterly, Vol. 26, No. 4 (Dec 2009), pp. 364-369.
- Kimball, Fiske. "Thomas Jefferson and the First Monument of the Classical Revival in America," Journal of the American Institute of Architects, Sept., Oct., and Nov. 1915.
- Kimball, Fiske. Thomas Jefferson, Architect, Boston, 1916.
- McCormick, Thomas J. (1990). Charles-Louis Clérisseau and the Genesis of Neoclassicism. Cambridge and London: MIT Press/The Architectural History Foundation. Includes as Appendix C, pp. 221-224, a list of signed and dated works by Clérisseau.
- McCormick, Thomas, J. "An Unknown Collection of Drawings by Charles-Louis Clérisseau", Journal of the Society of Architectural Historians, Vol. 22, No. 3 (Oct., 1963), pp. 119-126.
- Neverov, Oleg. "Catherine the Great: Public and Private Collector", The British Art Journal, Vol. 2, No. 2, (Winter 2000/2001), pp. 121-126.
- O'Brien, Charles H. "New Light on the Mouton-Natoire Case (1768): Freedom of Conscience and the Role of the Jansenists", Journal of Church and State, Vol. 27, No. 1 (Winter 1985), pp. 65-82.
- Skinner, Basil. "Nineteen Drawings by C. L. Clérisseau", The Burlington Magazine, vol. 105, issue 721, April 1963, pp. 160-162.
- Speler, Ralf-Torsten. Clérisseau, V. Erdmannsdorff, and Jefferson: The Dessau-Woerlitz Early Classicist Period and German-American Relations in Art and Culture in the Age of Enlightenment. Martin Luther University Halle-Wittenberg, 1989.
