= Château de Gaillon =

Renaissance castle in Normandy, France

Coordinates: 49°9′40″N 1°19′47″E

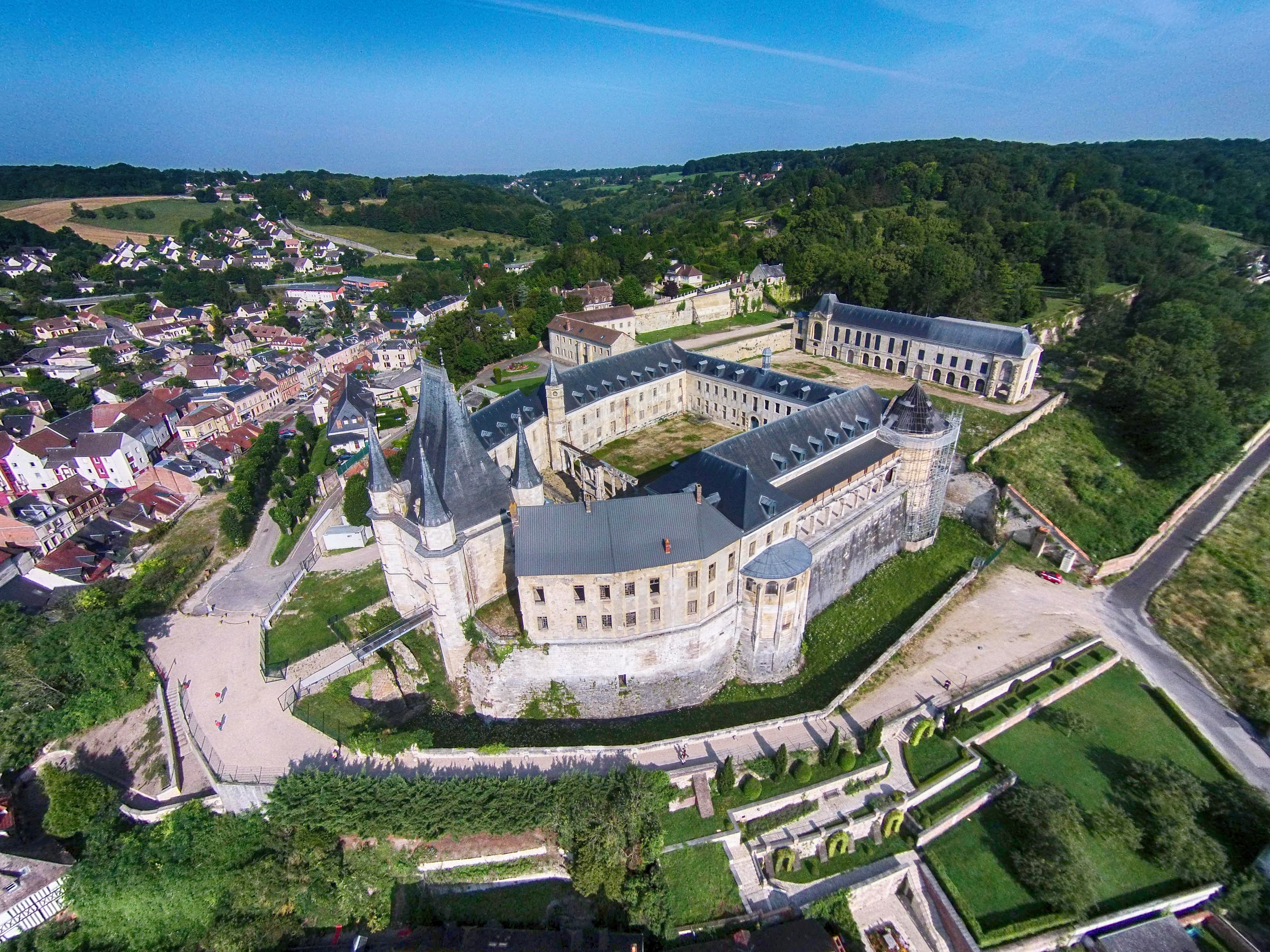
Aerial view of Château de Gaillon

The Château de Gaillon is a French Renaissance castle located in Gaillon, Normandy region of France.

== History ==
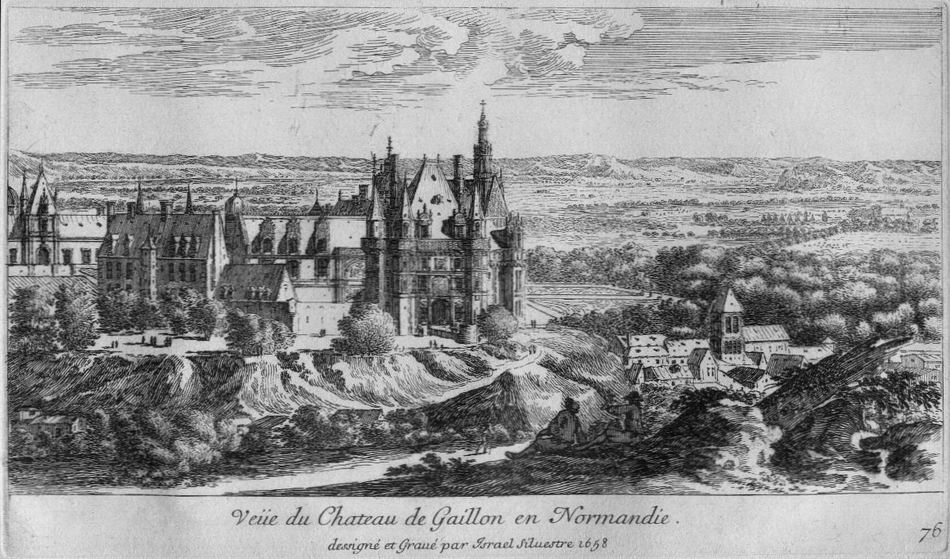
Château de Gaillon; the engraving by Israel Silvestre, dated 1658, shows the informal massing around the gatehouse of 1509; part of the lower parterre is visible at the right.

The somewhat battered and denuded Château de Gaillon, begun in 1502 on ancient foundations was the summer archiepiscopal residence of Georges d'Amboise, Cardinal Archbishop of Rouen; he made of the old château-fort a palatial Early Renaissance structure of unparalleled luxury and magnificence, the most ambitious and significant French building project of its time. Isabella d'Este Gonzaga was kept abreast of its development from the Mantuan ambassador in France.

When in 1498 his patron, the duc d'Orléans, acceded to the throne as Louis XII, d'Amboise, who had spent much time in northern Italy on diplomatic missions and had been viceroy in Milan in 1500, where he had met Leonardo da Vinci and other artists and humanists, was suddenly raised to the high position of cardinal and prime minister. He had access to the architect-engineer Fra Giocondo, who had been invited to France by the king, and to the Italian garden designer Pacello da Mercogliano. By 1508 Gaillon's splendid new ranges and gardens, one of the first Renaissance structures in France, were fit to receive Louis XII and his queen, Anne de Bretagne.

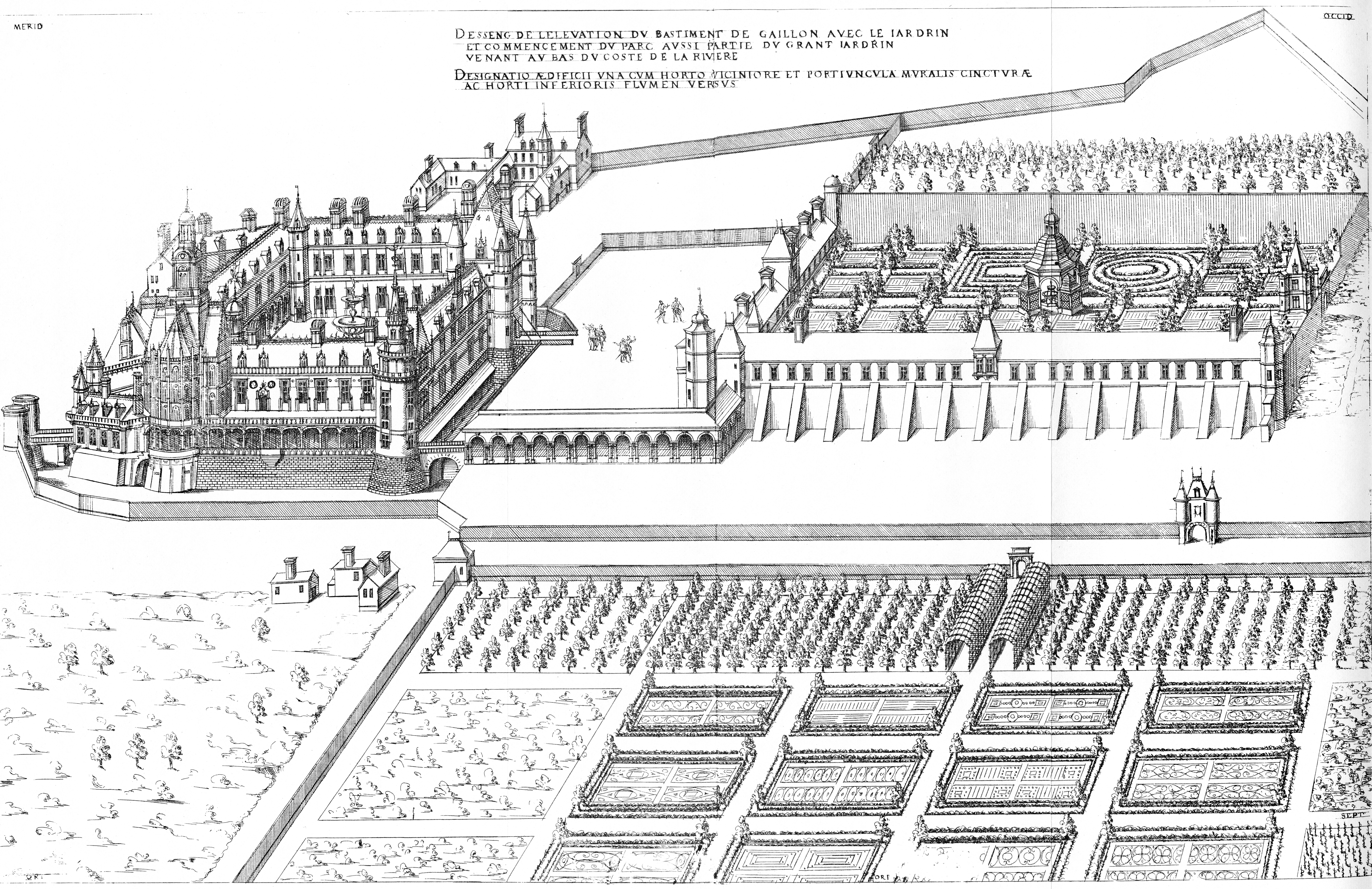
Lateral view from the east, 1576

The Gothic range that formed an irregular outer court is entered through a massive gatehouse, remodeled in 1509, with octagonal corner towers and steep-pitched slate roofs. The decorative elements of its shallow-relief carvings in panels and pilasters are drawn from the Classical repertory. Behind the first, irregular court Cardinal d'Amboise constructed a range, the Galerie des Cerfs with the central triumphal gateway, the Porte de Genes (the "Genoa Gate"), which set apart a trapezoidal cour d'honneur surrounded by two-storey ranges, two facing one another with arcaded lower storeys. High pitched slate roofs were rhythmically pierced with dormers. A helical staircase tower stood in one corner.

The north range was the new Grand'Maison, begun in 1502, which contained the suite of apartments of Cardinal d'Amboise. Between the chapel and the Tour de la Sirène at the northeast corner of the château, runs the vaulted gallery open to the view over the valley of the Seine. It is the first French loggia with an outward-looking aspect.

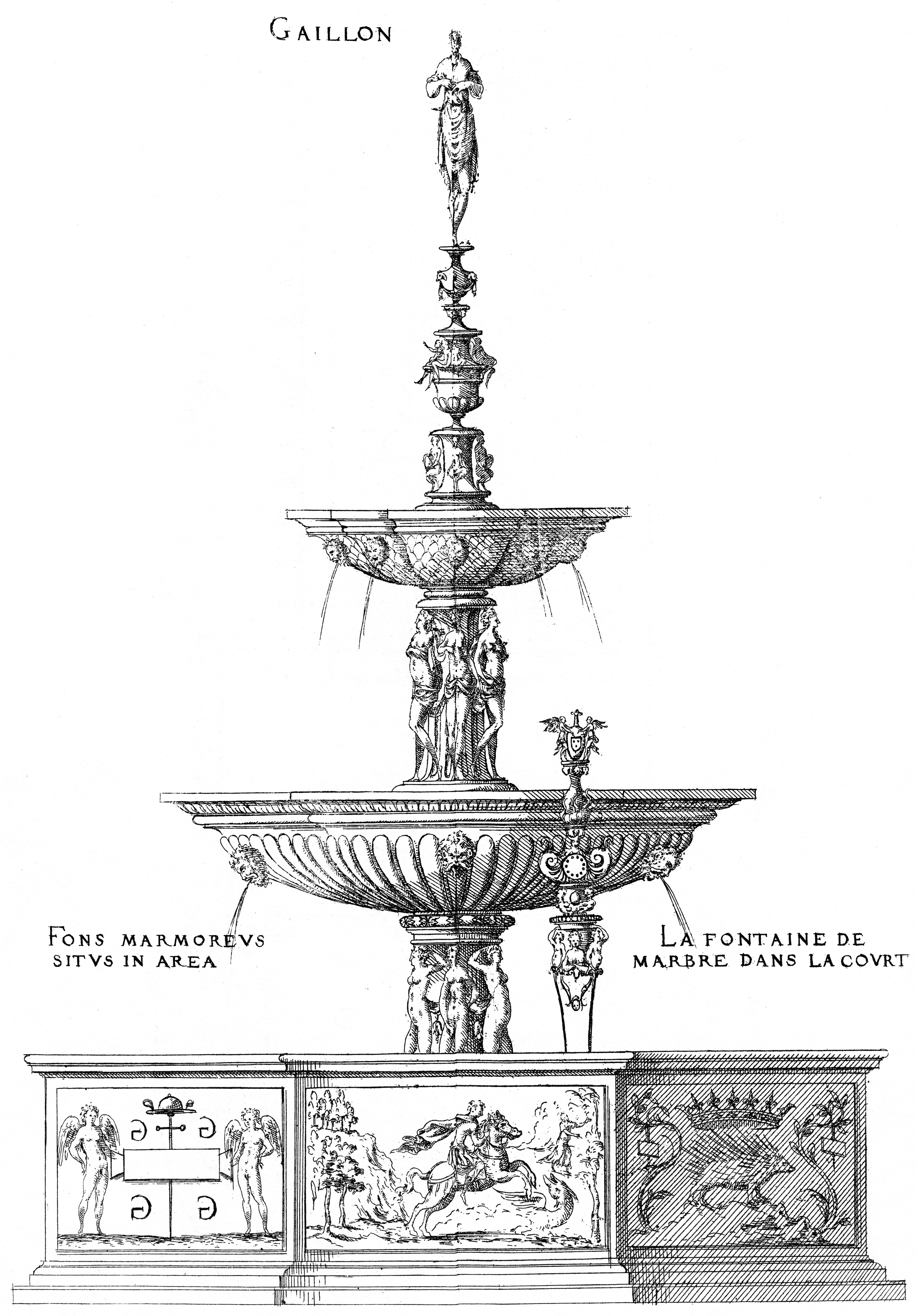
Marble Fountain, engraving by Jacques Androuet du Cerceau, 1576

At the center of the court once stood the finest fountain in France, which received its own plate in Jacques Androuet du Cerceau's Les Plus Excellents Bastiments de France. The fountain was commissioned on 14 September 1506 from the Genoese sculptors Agostino Solari, Antonio della Porta and Pace Gazini, as a gift from the Republic of Venice to Cardinal d'Amboise, for having evicted the Sforza from Milan.

It was twenty-two feet high, surmounted by a sculpture of John the Baptist, whose presence was a reminder of such fountains' origins in baptismal fonts, above stacked vase forms with lactating Graces and urinating boys by Bertrand de Meynal and Jérôme Pacherot. Masks spat water from two superposed basins above an octagonal tank with heraldic and emblematic bas-reliefs. At the time it was built the fountain at Gaillon perhaps had no equal in Italy, unless it was inspired by a feature in the gardens of Poggio Reale, laid out for Alfonso II of Naples. The lower octagonal Carrara marble basin was removed from Gaillon when the fountain was disassembled by the Cardinal de la Rochefoucauld in 1754 and set up in the gardens at Liancourt (Oise). In 1911 it was removed to the Château de la Rochefoucauld, where it may be seen today on the upper terrace.

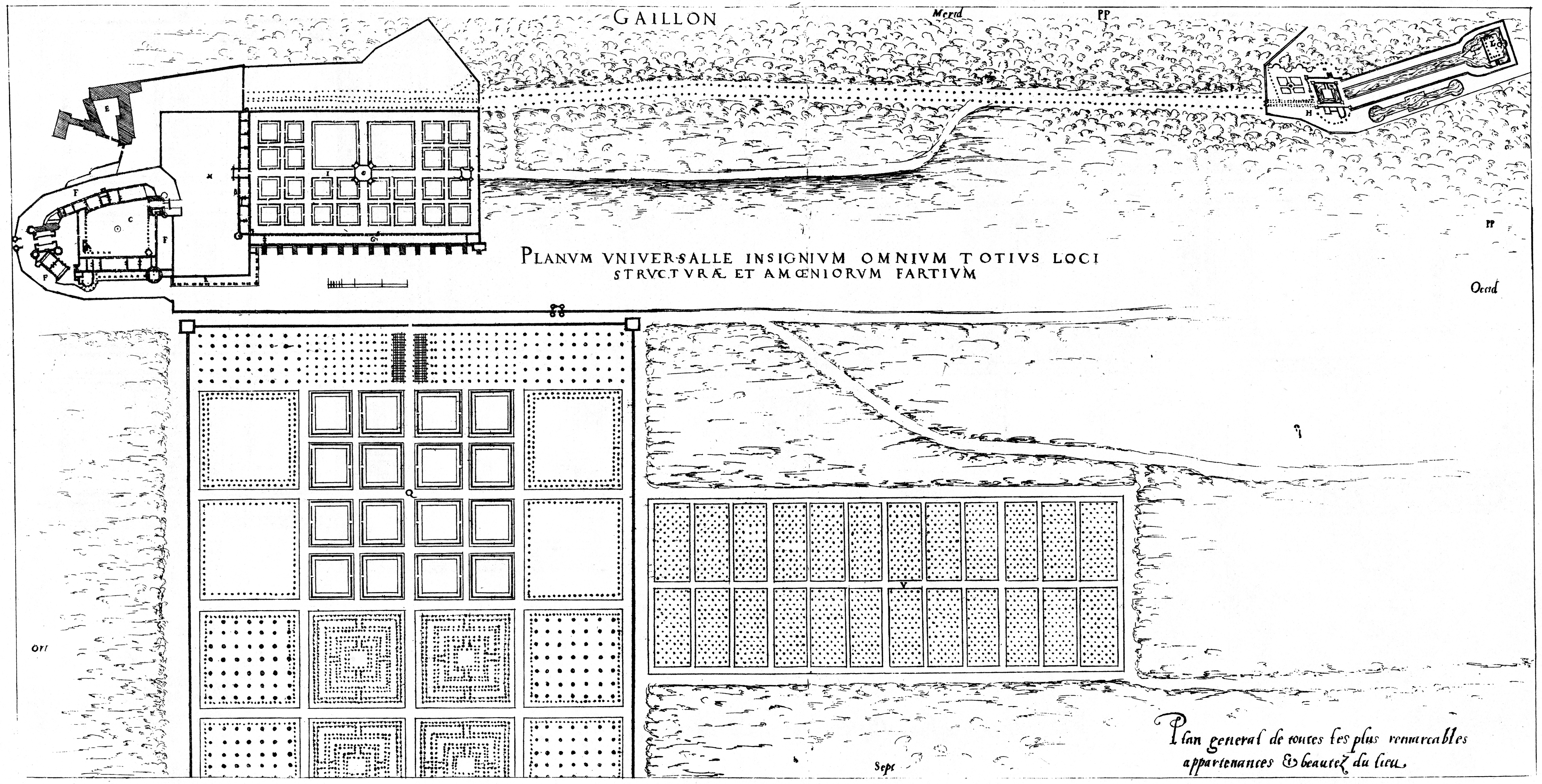
General plan of 1576 with the château on the left, the gallery garden by Mercogliano behind it, the lower-level garden at the bottom, and the Maison Blanche in the upper right

From the main court, a second-turreted gatehouse in one corner opened onto a bridge across the moat that provided access to a large courtyard, on the far side of which a range of new buildings with a central towered gateway opened into the splendid enclosed parterre designed by Pacello da Mercogliano. Its wide central gravelled walk led through a central pavilion open in four directions to a two-story pavilion set into the far wall. The high ground to the left was planted with trees. On the right a long gallery enclosing the parterre separated it from the patterned beds of vegetables and fruit trees on a lower level, beneath a massively buttressed retaining wall. A number of conservative features stand out in this project at the dawn of the French formal garden, notably the enclosure of the main parterre and the lack of cohesive linking the various features. "At Gaillon the possibilities of the terraced site are ignored as had also been the case at Blois, and the use of ramps or stairs to achieve an architectural unity did not seem as yet a possibility" (Adams 1969 p 18).

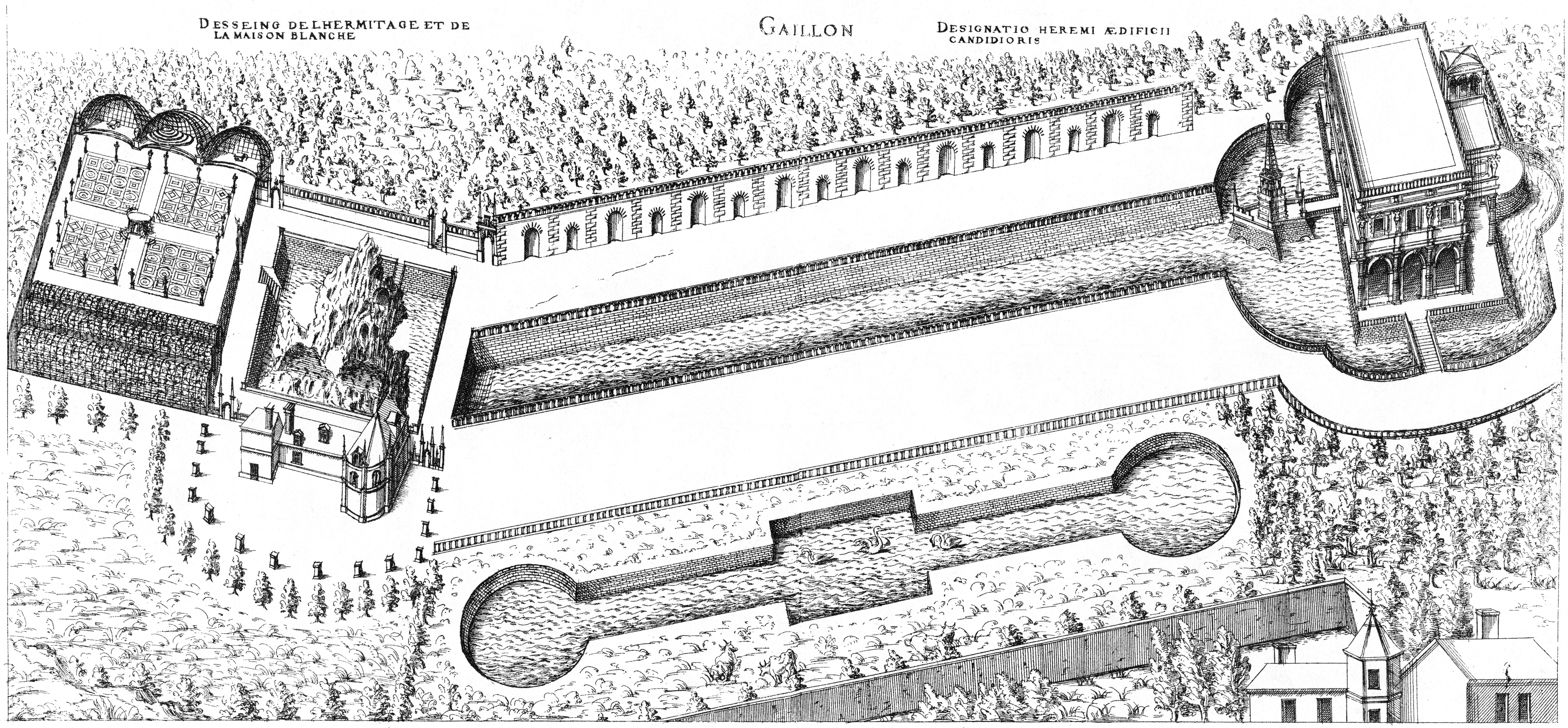
Bird's-eye view of the Hermitage and the Maison Blanche, engraving by Jacques Androuet du Cerceau, 1576

At Gaillon Charles Cardinal de Bourbon succeeded Cardinal d'Amboise. For him an avenue was cut through the woods of the uppermost garden level; it led to a terrace cut into the wooded slope with the Maison Blanche, a two-story white marble pavilion with an arcaded lower story that was set on an artificial island at the end of a short canal; at the other end was a "hermitage" of rockwork rising from the center of a square water tank. Both the pavilion and the rockwork Parnasse de Gaillon contained grottos, the one natural, the other architectural. In 1566, when the Cardinal entertained Catherine de' Medici during the siege of Rouen at the height of the Wars of Religion, the Maison Blanche was the setting for a pastoral masque. The features were engraved by Jacques Androuet du Cerceau, whom William Howard Adams has suggested may have designed the ensemble (Adams 1969 p. 25-26, figs 17–18).

Gaillon received a long succession of royal guests: Henri III and Henri IV, Louis XIV, and chancellor Séguier.

Jacques-Nicolas Colbert, the son of Jean-Baptiste Colbert and Archbishop of Rouen, further embellished the château and its grounds with the work of Jules Hardouin-Mansart and André Le Nôtre.

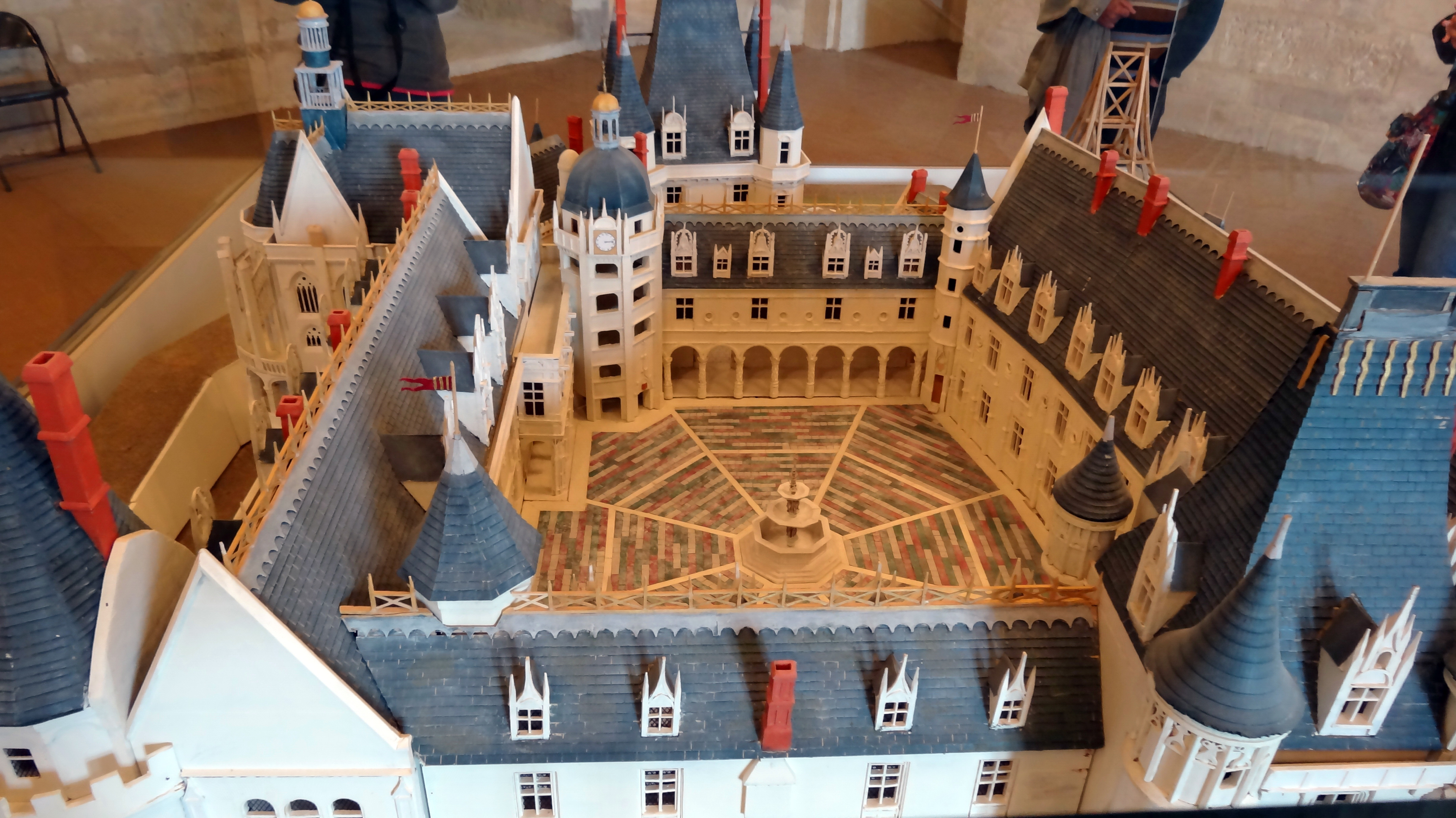
Fountain in the court of the château (model of château de Gaillon).

Gaillon was burned out in a violent fire in 1764, but reconstructed: here the Cardinal de la Rochefoucauld received Benjamin Franklin and Louis XVI as a Carthusian monastery until the Revolution. Vandalized and emptied in 1790, it was sold as a national property and partly dismantled, then served as a penitentiary 1812-1827 before being sold again to a local farmer in 1834, with the laconic remark "Ce domaine est des plus beaux de France."

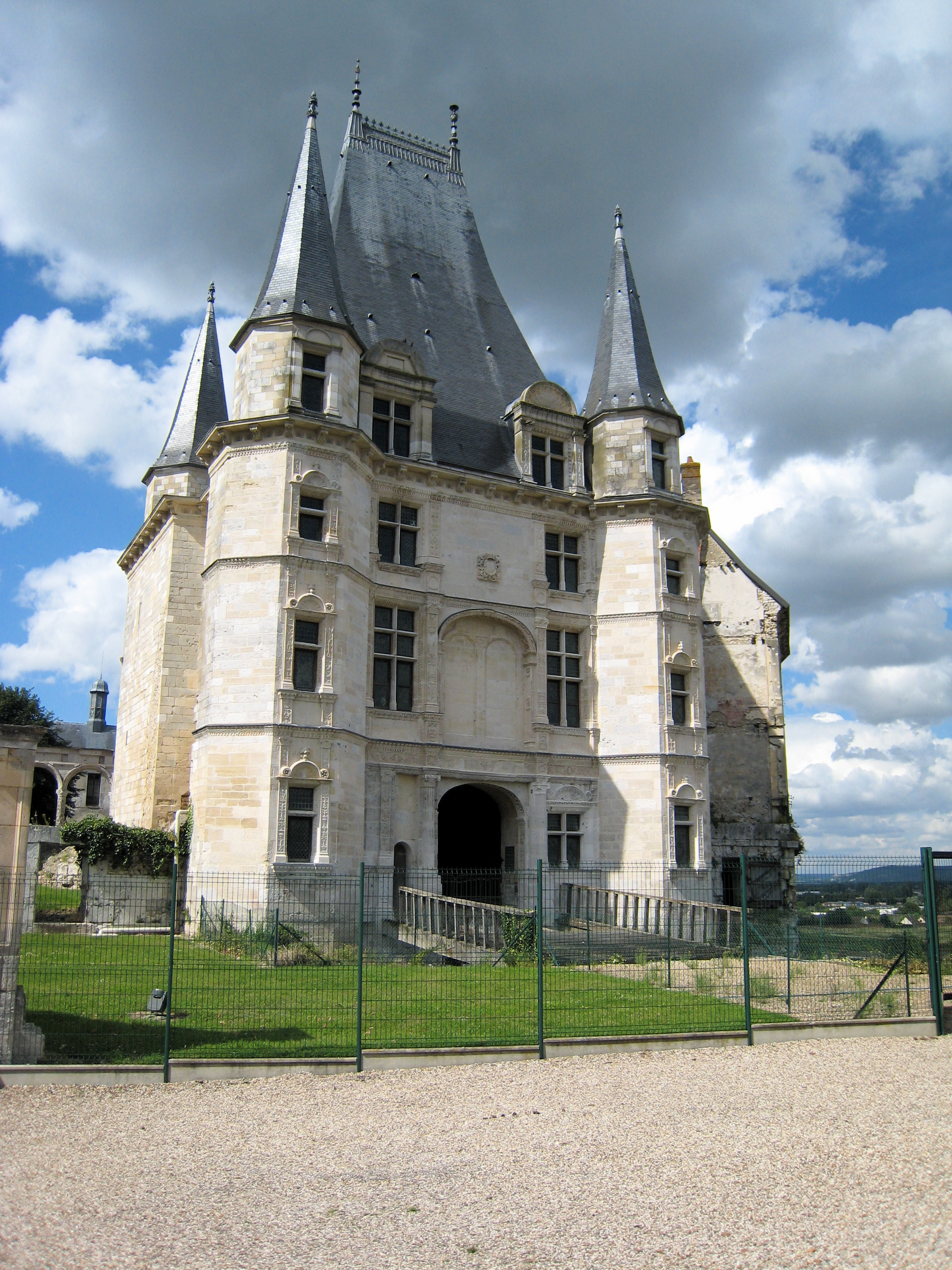
The gatehouse of the Château de Gaillon in 2007.

One section of Fra Giocondo's facade of Gaillon was removed under the direction of Alexandre Lenoir in the early nineteenth century for his Museum of French Monuments in Paris. Lenoir's collection of architectural remnants stood on land across the Seine from the Louvre, the very ground that the French government provided for the establishment of the École des Beaux-Arts around 1830. At the direction of architect Félix Duban the portal was integrated into the courtyard design and served as a model for students of architecture. Recently the elements of the Galerie des Cerfs and the Porte de Gênes have been restored to their original positions at Gaillon once again.

The Château is distinctly battered in its present appearance. An idea of the refinement of its furnishing can be derived from the marble bas-relief of St. George and the Dragon, executed in 1508 for the high chapel by Michel Colombe, now at the Louvre Museum, Paris.
