= Jacques II Androuet du Cerceau =

French architect

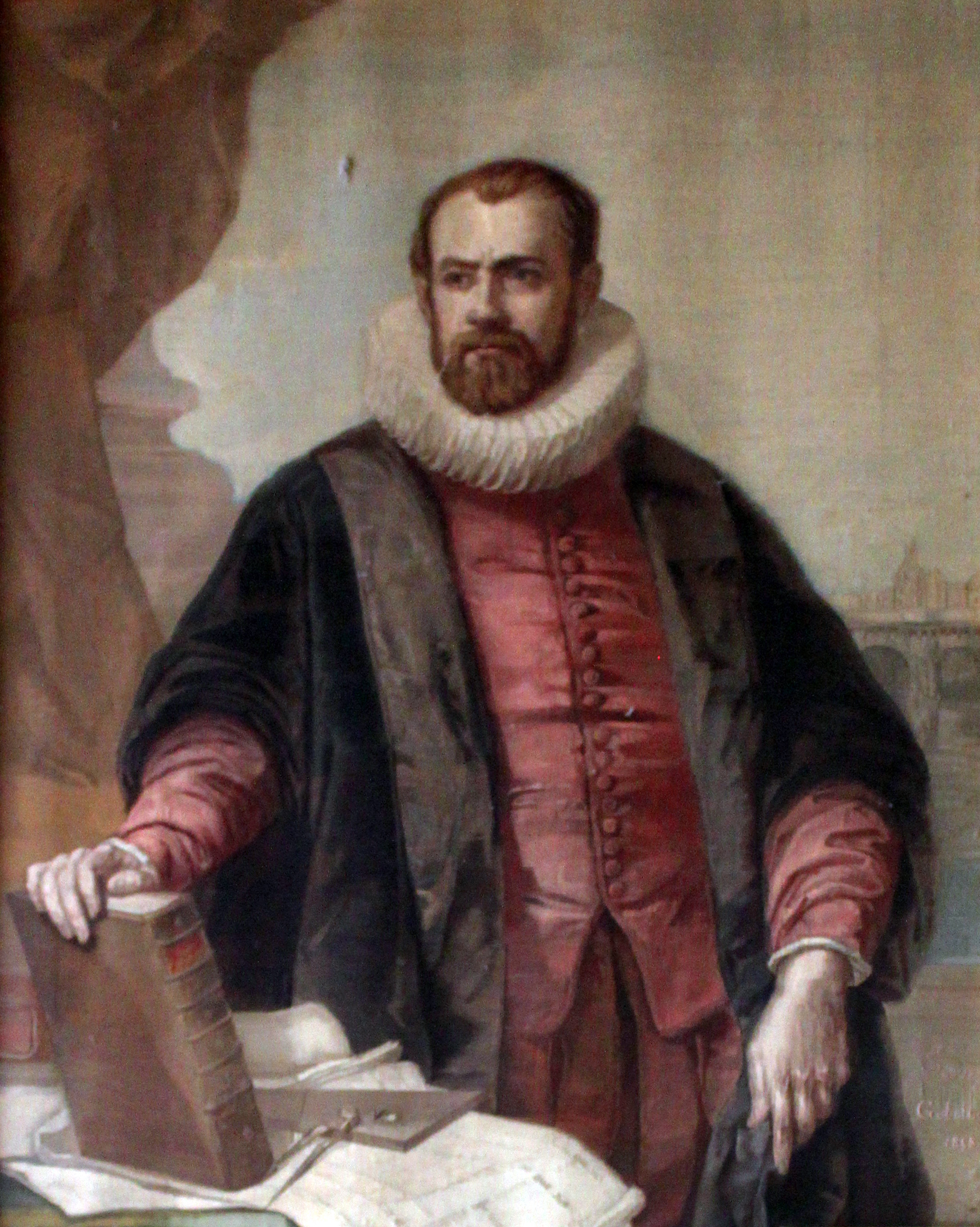
An invented 19th-century tapestry portrait of Jacques Androuet du Cerceau, the younger, in the Galerie d'Apollon of the Louvre

Jacques Androuet du Cerceau, the younger (1550 – 16 September 1614), was a French architect.

== Life and career ==
He was born in Paris, the son of the eminent French architect and engraver, Jacques I Androuet du Cerceau, and the brother of the architect Baptiste Androuet du Cerceau.

He worked at the Château de Charleval in the 1570s and was responsible for military fortifications in Tours in the 1580s. He also worked on the Château de Verneuil-sur-Oise (ruins), the Château de Montceaux (destroyed 1798; ruins), and the Château de Nérac.

He became a royal architect during the reign of Henry III. In 1594, during the reign of Henry IV, Louis Métezeau was also appointed royal architect, a designation opposed by Androuet du Cerceau on the grounds that only one architect could hold the position at any given time. Androuet du Cerceau's claims were rejected in 1599, when the crown asserted its right to name as many royal architects as it wished.

It is considered unlikely that the two architects collaborated during their dispute. Androuet du Cerceau is traditionally credited with the design of the western section of the Louvre's Grande Galerie (1595–1610), which extended along the right bank of the Seine as part of Henry IV's grand project to link the Louvre to the Tuileries Palace, while the eastern section, in a very different style, is traditionally credited to Louis Métezeau. The project was abruptly halted after the assassination of the king in 1610, but the Grande Galerie and the Gros Pavilion des Tuileries (begun in 1595, now known as the Pavillon de Flore), that formed the junction between the Grande Galerie and the south end of the Tuileries, were completed, but in the 1860s Androuet du Cerceau's work was entirely demolished and rebuilt in a different design by the Louvre's architect Hector Lefuel.

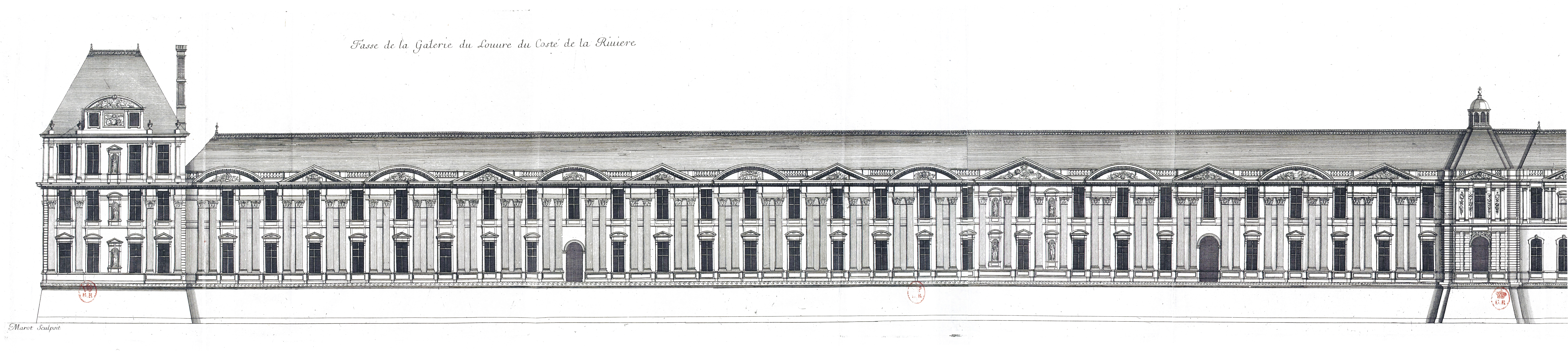
River facade of the Pavillon de Flore and the western section of the Louvre's Grande Galerie, engraved by Jean Marot (c. 1670)

== See also ==
- Androuet du Cerceau for the family

== Bibliography ==
- Baldus, Édouard. Oeuvre de Jacques Androuet dit du Cerceau. Meubles. Paris; Edouard Baldus: c.1880
- Ballon, Hilary (1991). The Paris of Henri IV: Architecture and Urbanism. Cambridge, Massachusetts: The MIT Press. ISBN 9780262023092.
- Miller, Naomi (1996). "Du Cerceau. French family of artists.", vol. 9, pp. 350–354, in The Dictionary of Art, edited by Jane Turner, reprinted with minor corrections in 1998. ISBN 9781884446009. Also at Oxford Art Online.
