= Pacello da Mercogliano =

Pacello da Mercogliano (Middle French: Pierre de Mercollienne; c. 1455 in Mercogliano – 1534) was an Italian-born garden designer and hydraulic engineer, who is documented as working for Charles VIII at Amboise, France, with the responsibility of bringing water from the Loire up to the garden parterres laid out to one side of the château. He was assisting the architect-engineer Fra Giocondo, who had translated Frontinus's essay on the ancient aqueducts of Rome, De aquis urbae Romanae. After Charles VIII's death in 1498, both men continued to be employed by Louis XII at Blois, whence he had removed the court.

At the Château de Gaillon, begun in 1502, Georges Cardinal d'Amboise employed Pacello on the gardens. Neither there, nor at Amboise or Blois, where the foundations of the castles crowned steep defensible sites, was Pacello able to tie the axes of his garden parterres to a facade of the château in any meaningful way, as was becoming the usual practice on sloping sites below Italian villas.

In the plans of all three châteaux that were drawn after c. 1566 and appeared in Jacques Androuet du Cerceau's Les plus excellents bastimens de France (1576), it is difficult to judge what of Pacello's patterned plantings may still be recognized. Nevertheless, he may be considered one of the founding spirits of the French formal garden.
