= Château d'Opme =

11th-century castle converted to a château in Romagnat, France

Coordinates: 45.7074°N 3.0900°E

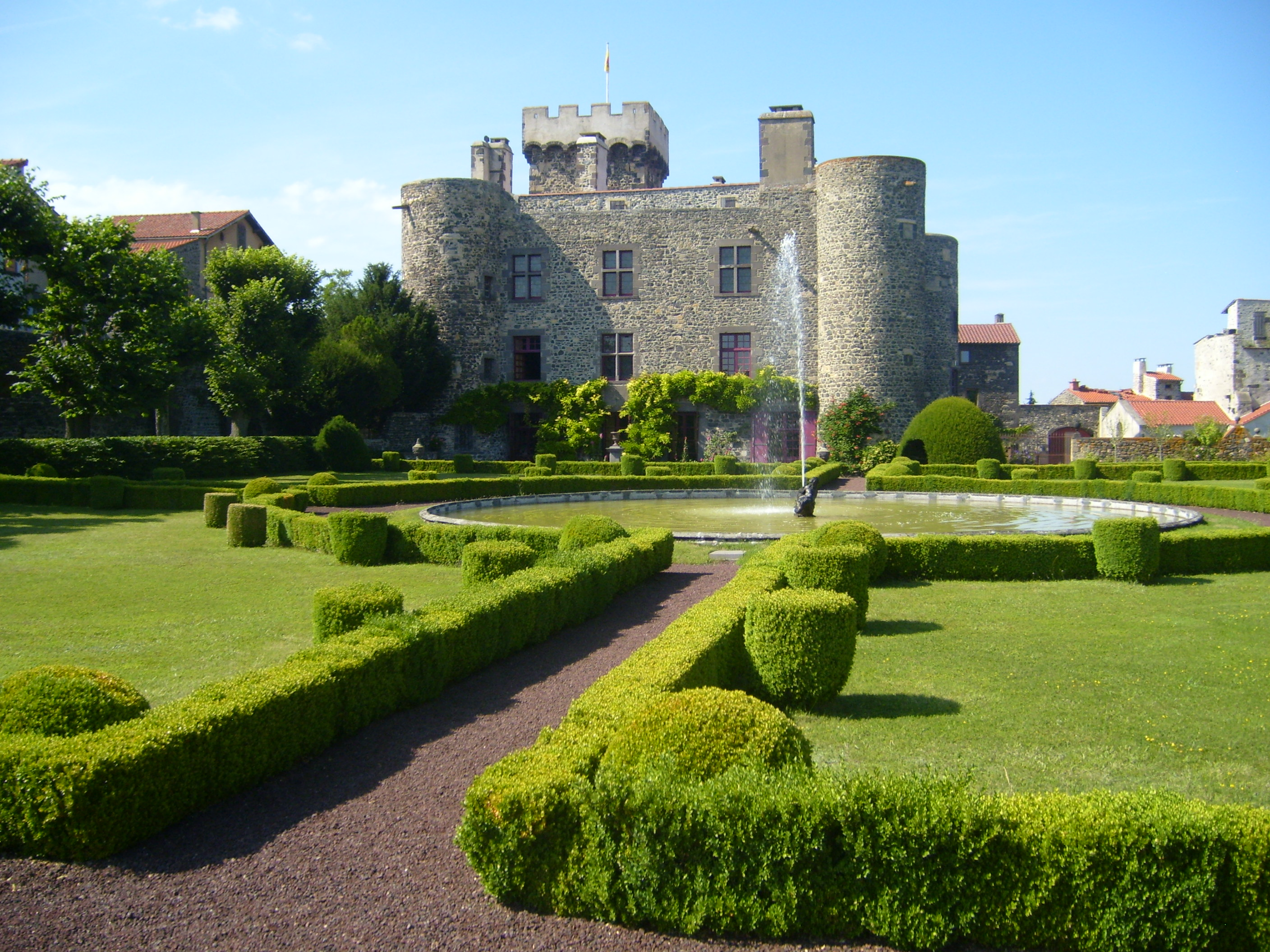
Chateau d'Opme in the Auvergne

The Château d'Opme (pronounced 'ome') is an 11th-century castle, later converted to an elegant château, located in the commune of Romagnat, in the département of Puy-de-Dôme, in the Auvergne region of France, nine kilometers south of Clermont-Ferrand. Both the château and garden are classified as Historic Monuments by the French Ministry of Culture: the gardens are classified as a jardin remarquable (Remarkable Gardens of France) .

== History ==
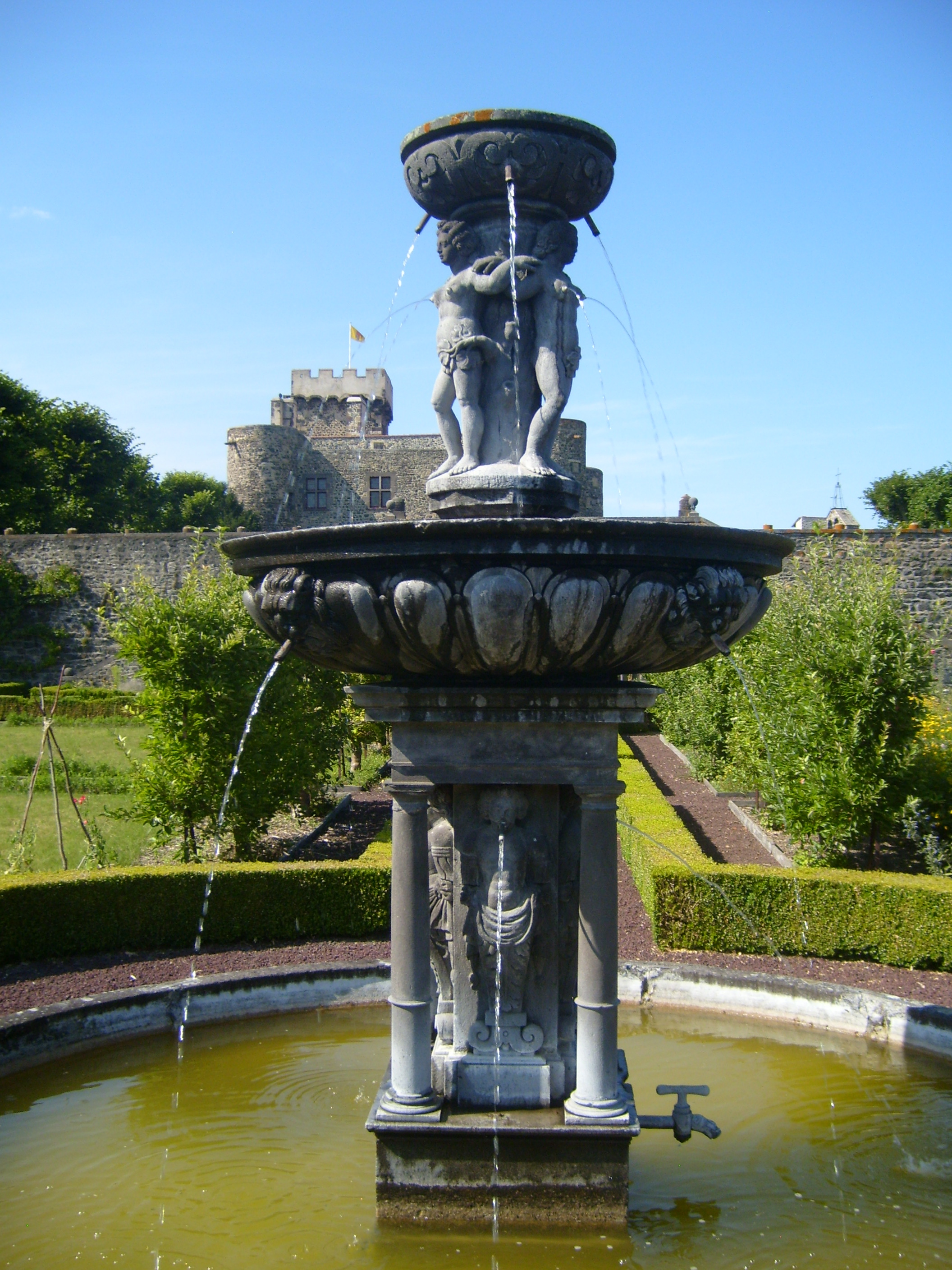
Fountain of the Chateau d'Opme (1617) attributed to Jean Androuet de Cerceau

The original castle was built at the end of the 11th century, making it one of the oldest castles in the Auvergne. It belonged to the Counts, and then the Dauphins, of Auvergne, and it guarded a pass through which ran the old Roman road from Clermont to Puy-en-Velay. Its name came from the Latin word Oppidum from the Gallo-Roman hilltop fortress towns of the region. The first castle had an interior court surrounded by five towers, three of which still stand. In the 12th century a taller square castle keep with crenelation replaced one of the corner towers. The castle was captured by the English in 1381, then recaptured in 1393 by Marechal Boucicault and Marechal Sancerre.

In 1613, the castle became the property of Antoine de Ribeyre, the treasurer of France under the very young King Louis XIII. Ribeyre transformed it from a fortress into an elegant residence in the style of the period; he built a ceremonial entrance, an interior stairway, and large windows, and created ornamental gardens on two terraces overlooking the valley.

In 1940 and 1941, the castle was the home and later hiding place of General Jean de Lattre de Tassigny, a hero of the Free French Army. During the German occupation, he established a school for officers for the new French army. in Opme, and later escaped France to join the Free French forces of General DeGaulle. The inner courtyard of the Chateau has a small museum of photos and objects relating to his stay there.

The castle was classified as an historic monument in 1916, and the gardens were classified in 1969.

== The gardens and fountain ==
The upper terrace is a French formal garden, with four sections of lawn surrounding a circular basin and fountain. The upper terrace is connected to the lower terrace by an unusual stone staircase with a double revolution. The lower terrace is a kitchen garden and flower garden and an alley of venerable linden trees, some of them three hundred years old. The center of the lower garden is decorated with carved ornamental fountain with two vasques attributed to Jean Androuet du Cerceau.

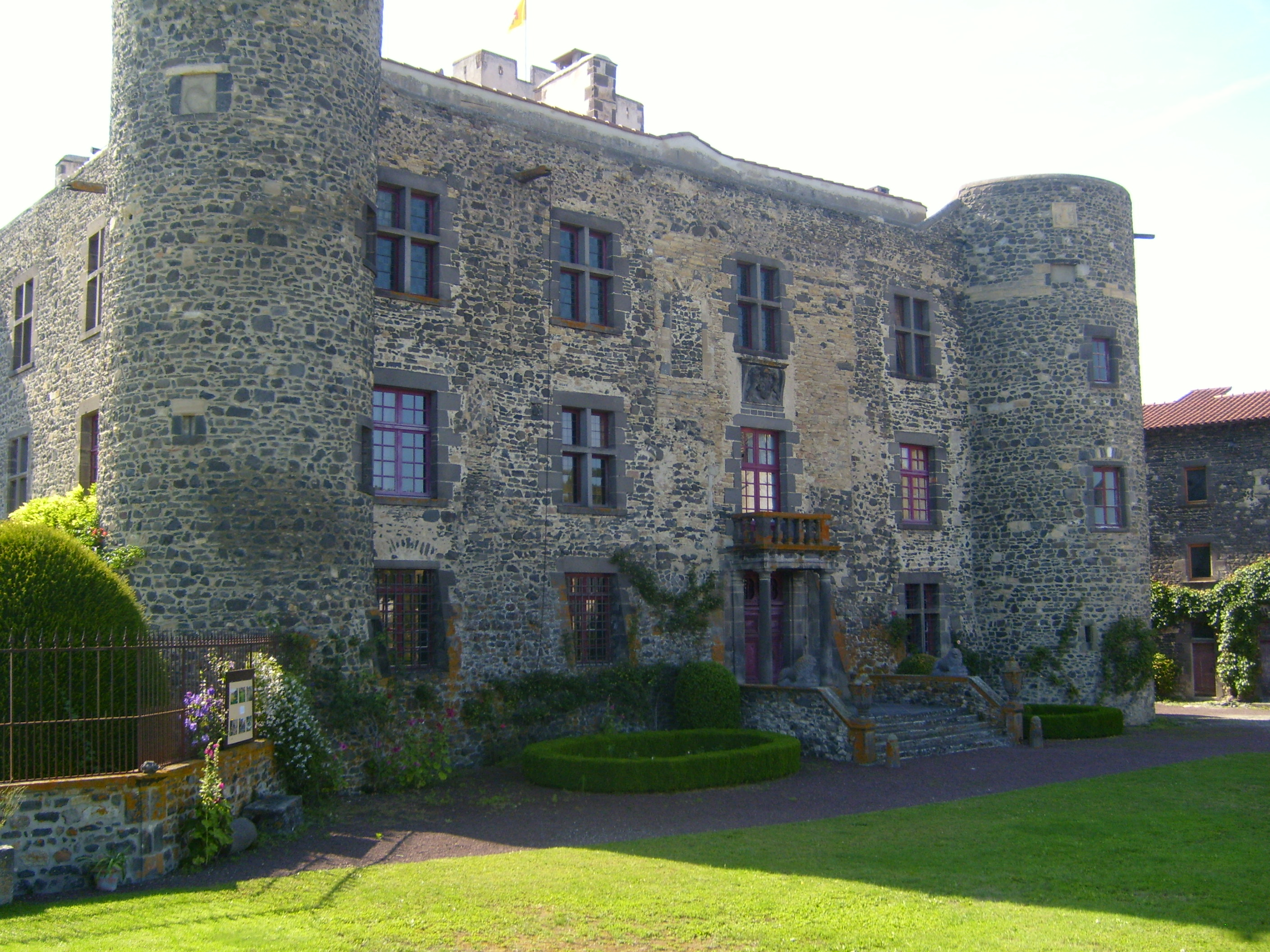
The facade of the Chateau; the wider windows and ceremonial entrance were added in the 17th century

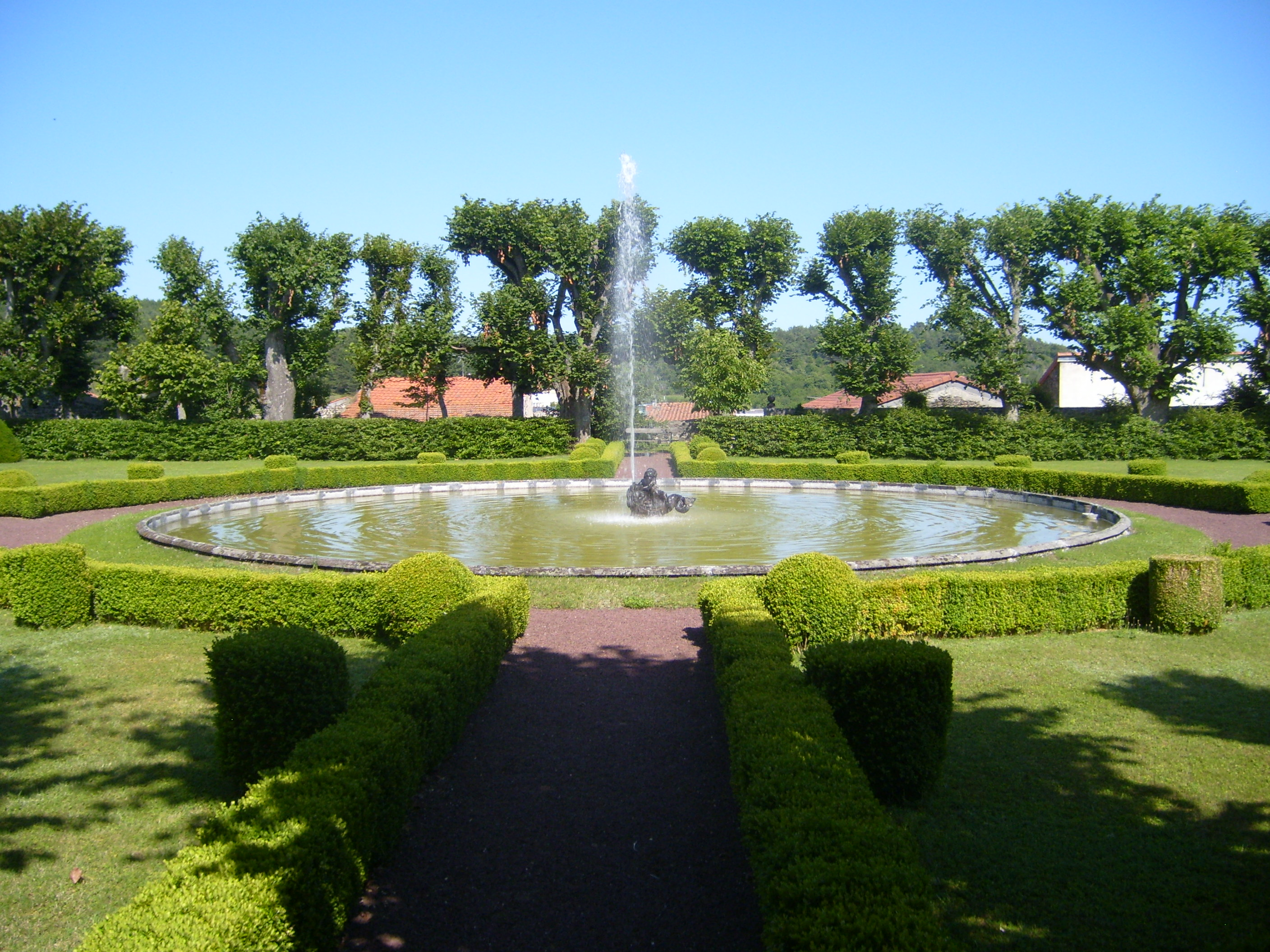
Upper garden of the Chateau d'Opme. The basin the upper garden fed water to the fountain in the lower garden.

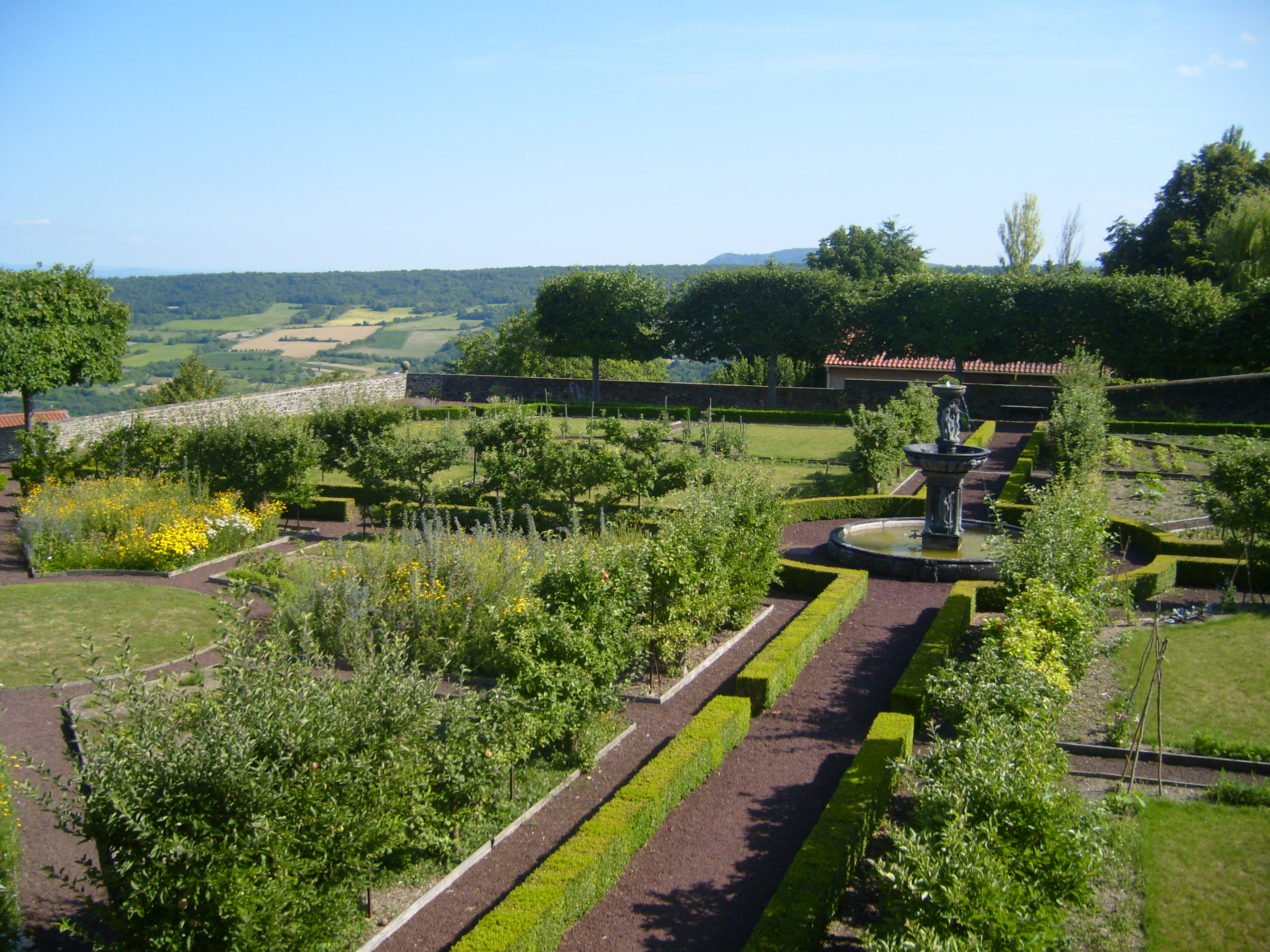
The lower terrace, with its kitchen garden and the fountain from 1617

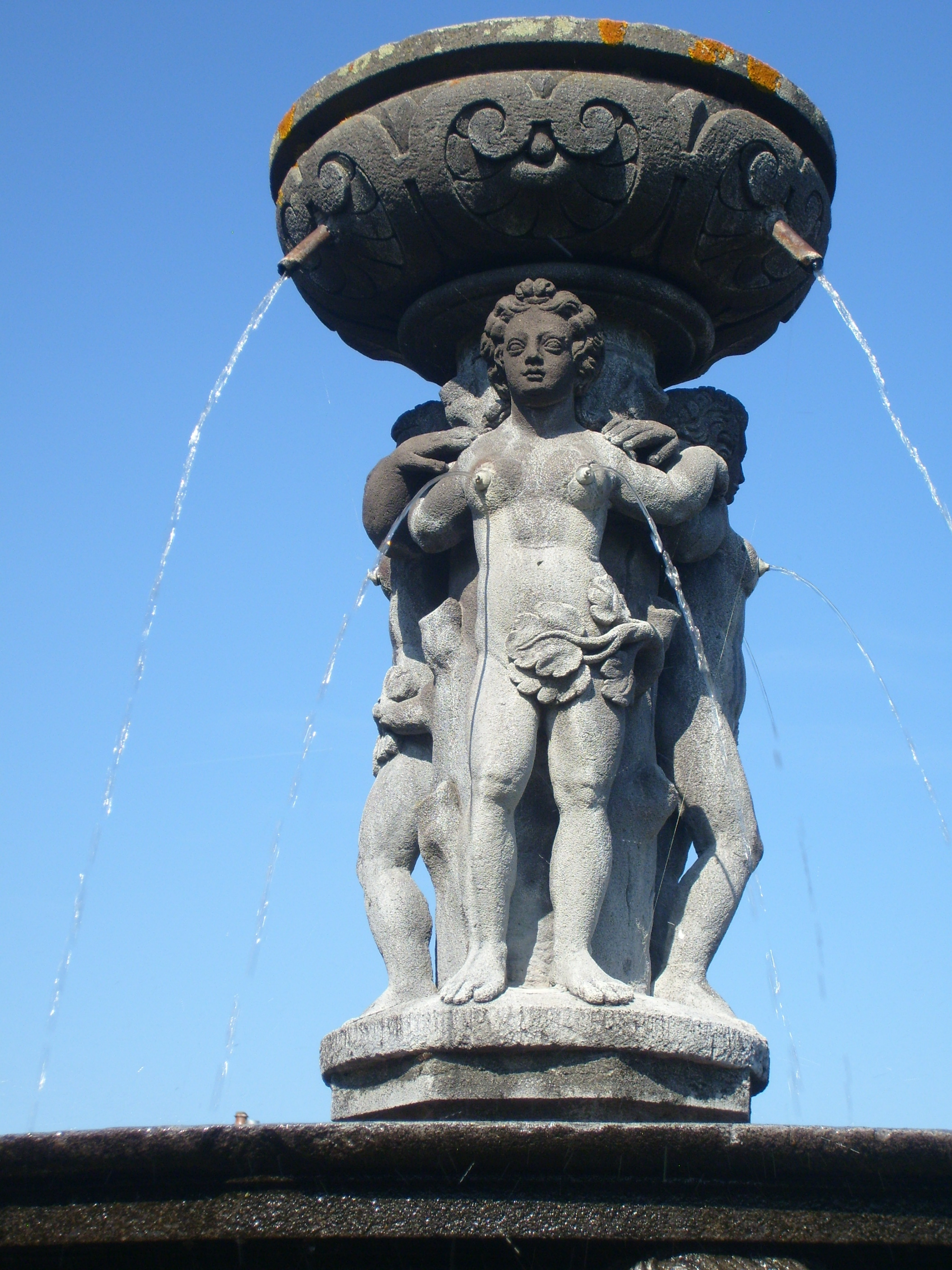
Detail of the fountain attributed to Jean Androuet du Cerceau (1617)

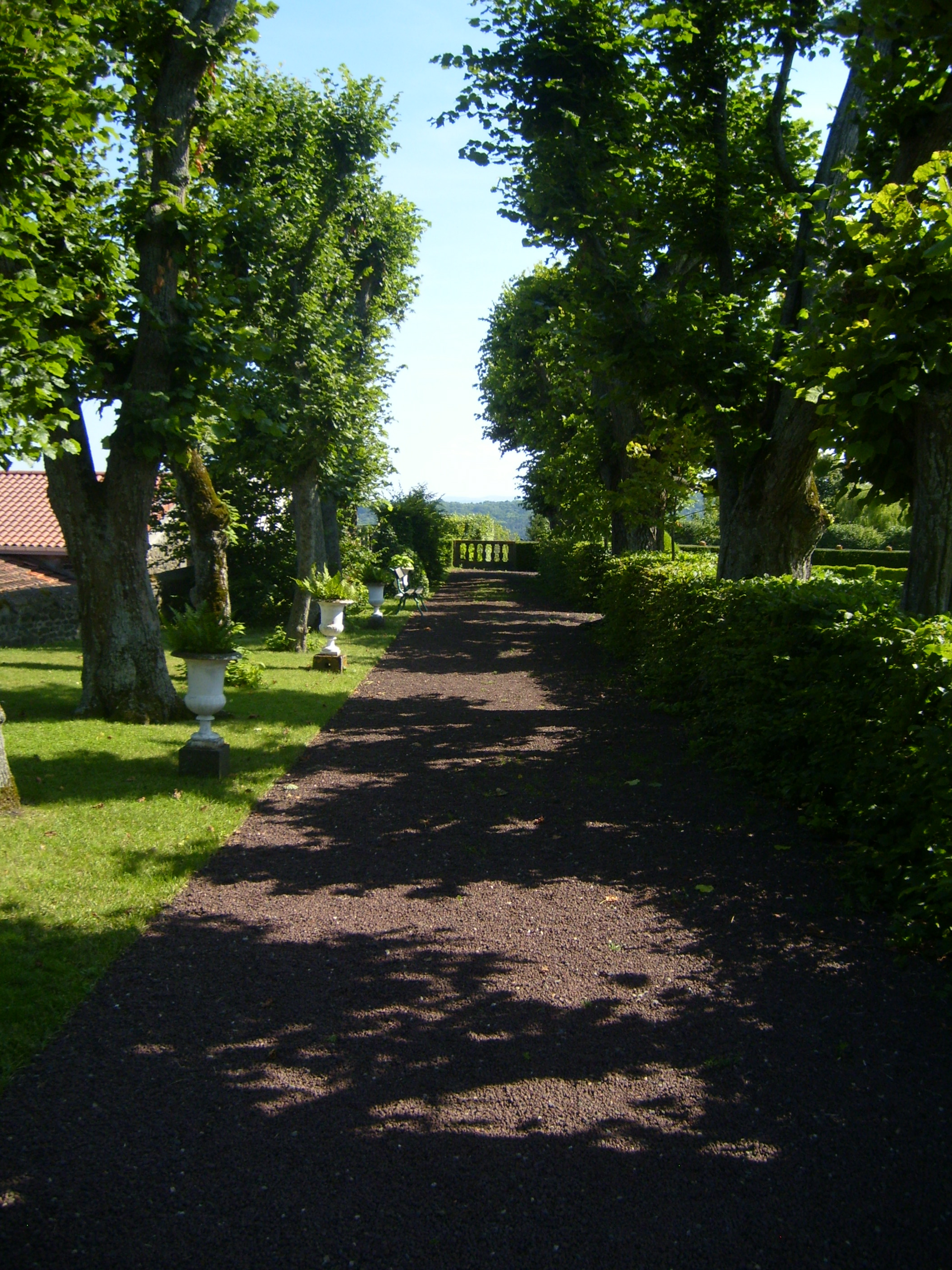
Alley of linden trees, some over 300 years old, in lower garden

== See also ==
- List of castles in France

== Bibliography ==
- Le Guide du patrimoine en France, Editions du Patrimoine, Centre des Monuments Nationaux, Paris (ISBN 978-2-85822-760-0)
