= Paul Androuet du Cerceau =

French goldsmith and engraver

Paul Androuet du Cerceau (1623–1710), was a French goldsmith and engraver, who was active in Paris around 1610. According to Benezit, Reynaud presumes he is the son of the architect Jean Baptiste Androuet du Cerceau, who built the Pont Neuf in Paris, but Paul is now believed to be the grandson of Jacques II Androuet du Cerceau.

== See also ==
- Androuet du Cerceau for the family

== Sources ==
- Benezit Dictionary of Artists (2006). "Ducerceau, Paul Androuet", vol. 4, p. 1241. Paris: Gründ. ISBN 9782700030709.
- Miller, Naomi (1996). "Du Cerceau. French family of artists.", vol. 9, pp. 350–354, in The Dictionary of Art, edited by Jane Turner, reprinted with minor corrections in 1998. ISBN 9781884446009.
