= Jean Androuet du Cerceau =

French architect

Jean Androuet du Cerceau (c.1585–1650) was a French architect, the son of Jean Baptiste Androuet du Cerceau.

Cerceau the younger is known for his hôtels particuliers in Paris. One, the most famous, is the Hôtel de Sully (1624–29), ranged symmetrically round a deep entrance court off the rue St-Antoine, which was commissioned by the financier Mesme Gallet and bought after its completion by Henri IV's faithful minister. Sculpted figures in high relief set against recessed panels alternate with pedimented windows. Another is the Hôtel de Bretonvilliers (1637–43). He added the divided horseshoe staircase to the main entrance of Fontainebleau (1632–34).

The daughter of Jacques I Androuet du Cerceau married the architect Jean de Brosse (architect), father of Salomon de Brosse, architect of the Palais du Luxembourg, Paris.

== See also ==
- Androuet du Cerceau for the family
