= Hôtel de Sully =

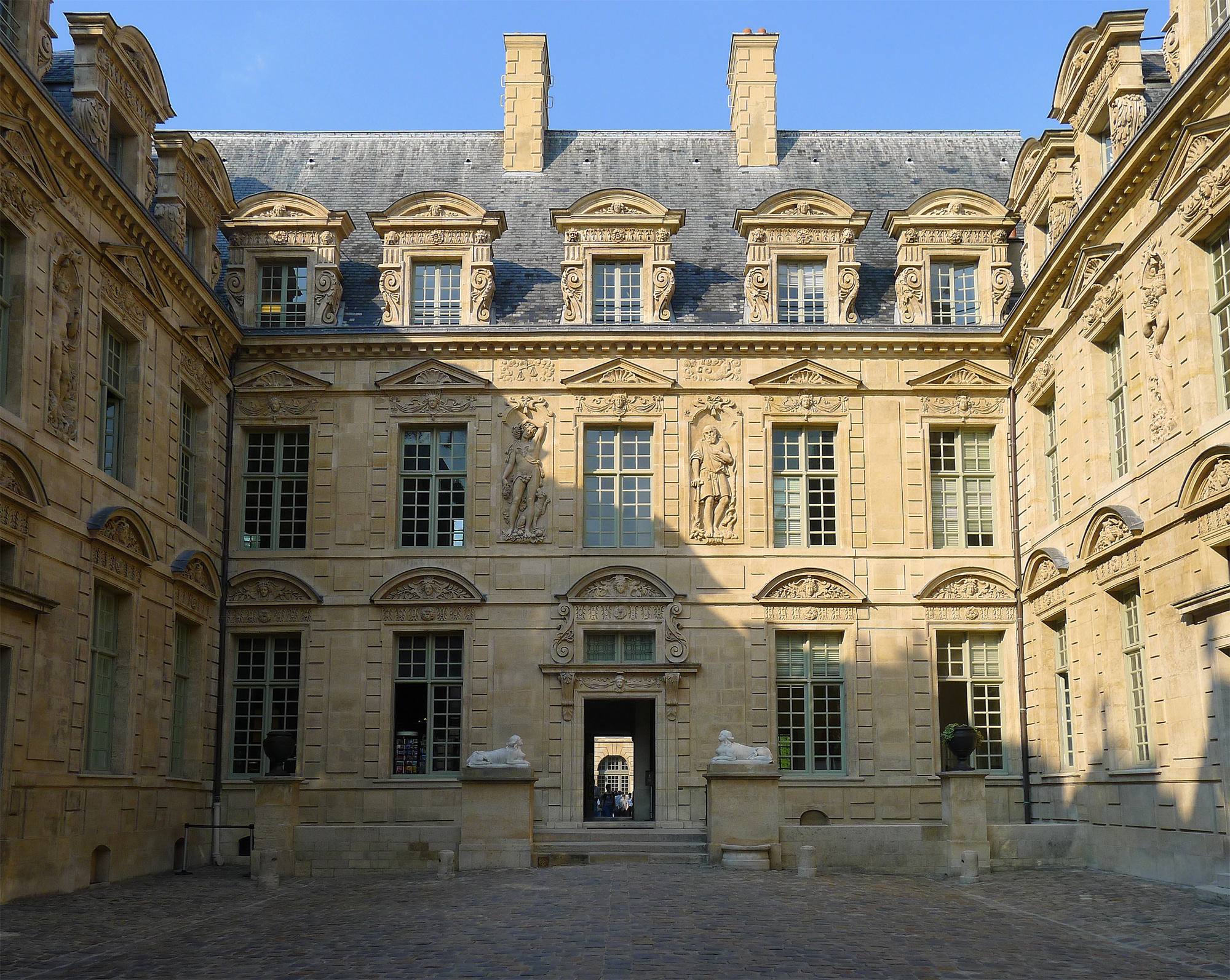
- Courtyard

General information
- Type: Hôtel particulier
- Architectural style: Louis XIII
- Location: 62, Rue Saint-Antoine, Paris, France
- Construction started: 1624
- Completed: 1630

Design and construction
- Architect: Jean Androuet du Cerceau

Website
- www.hotel-de-sully.fr/en

The Hôtel de Sully (French pronunciation: [otɛl d(ə) syli]) is a Louis XIII style hôtel particulier, or private mansion, located at 62 Rue Saint-Antoine in the Marais, 4th arrondissement, Paris, France. Built at the beginning of the 17th century, it is nowadays the seat of the Centre des monuments nationaux, the French national organization responsible for national heritage sites. It has been listed since 1862 as a monument historique by the Ministry of Culture.

== History ==
The Hôtel de Sully was built, with gardens and an orangery, between 1624 and 1630, for the wealthy financier Mesme Gallet. The building is usually attributed to the architect Jean Androuet du Cerceau. The site was chosen to give access to the Place Royale - today the Place des Vosges. The Marais was then an especially fashionable area for the high nobility; the construction of the Hôtel de Sully fits in a larger movement of monumental building in this part of Paris.

Maximilien de Béthune, Duke of Sully, and former Superintendent of Finances to King Henri IV, purchased the hôtel, completed and fully furnished, on 23 February 1634. He completed the redecoration of the building, and spent his last years living there. His grandson Maximilien commissioned architects, most probably Simon Lambert and François Le Vau, to build an additional wing in 1660, to the west of the garden. The Hôtel de Sully still bears the name of this family, who owned the building into the 18th century.

The hôtel then passed through the hands of various owners, becoming an investment property in the 19th century. Various additions and alterations were made, to accommodate trades, craftsmen and other tenants. In 1862 it was classified as a monument historique, and new owners, more concerned with conservation, gradually restored the building. It became a state-owned property in 1944. A long restoration programme was then undertaken, which was completed with the repair of the orangery in 1973.

Since 1967 it has been the home of the Caisse Nationale des Monuments Historiques et des Sites, which in 2000 became the Centre des Monuments Nationaux. This public body, under the supervision of the Ministry of Culture and Communication, is responsible for the management of historic buildings and monuments in state care.

== Gallery ==
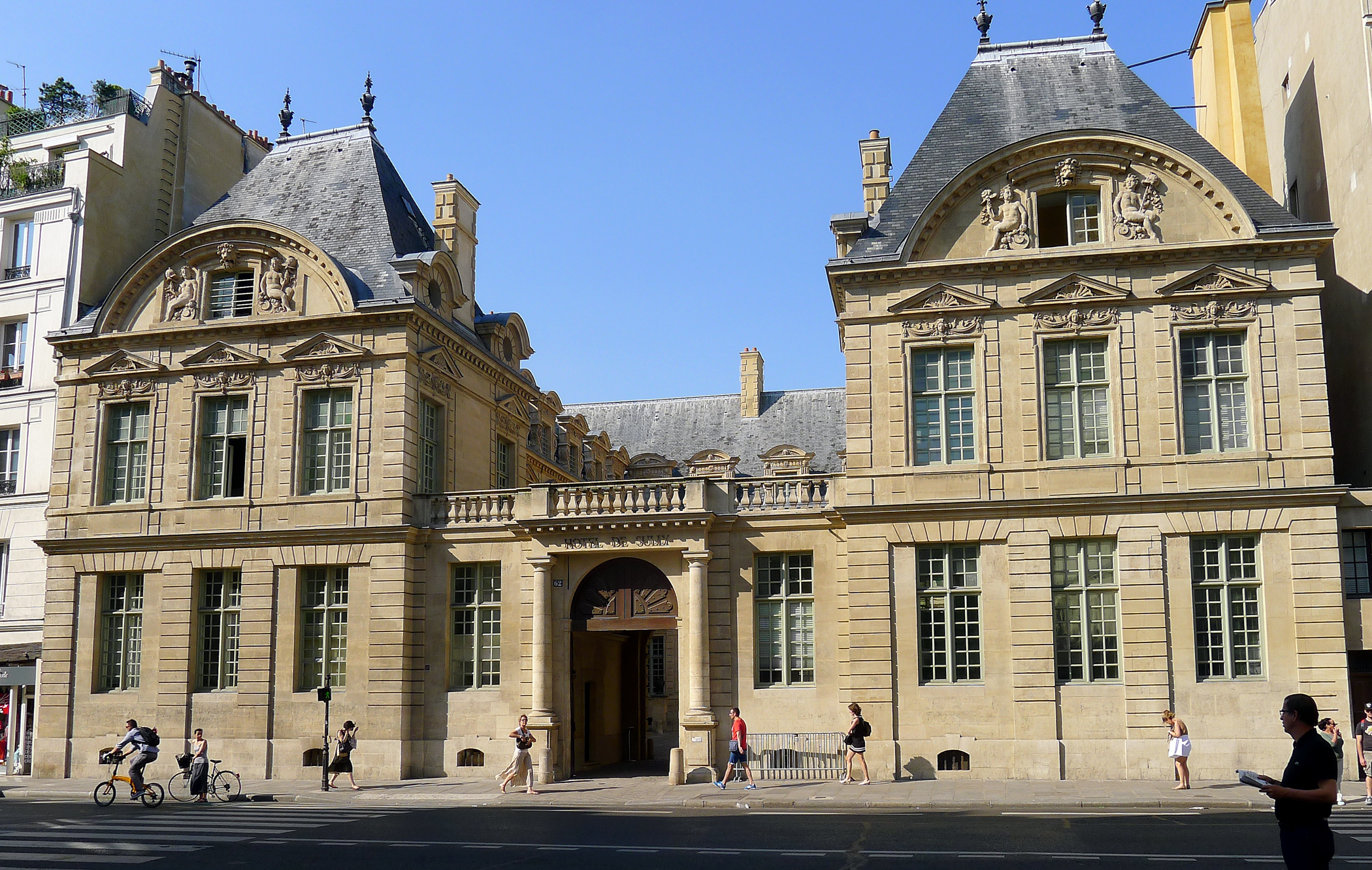
Façade facing the rue Saint-Antoine

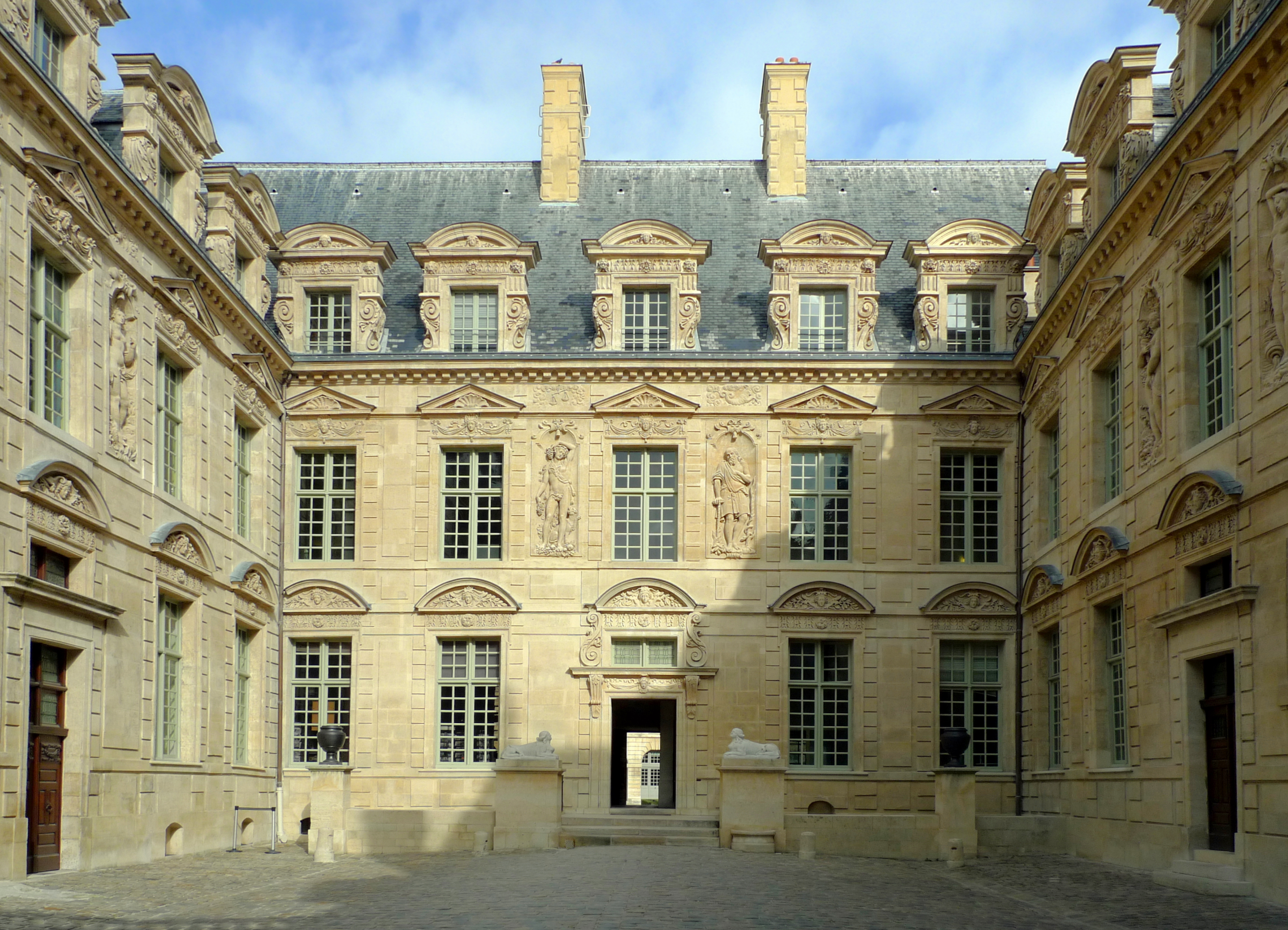
Main building from the courtyard

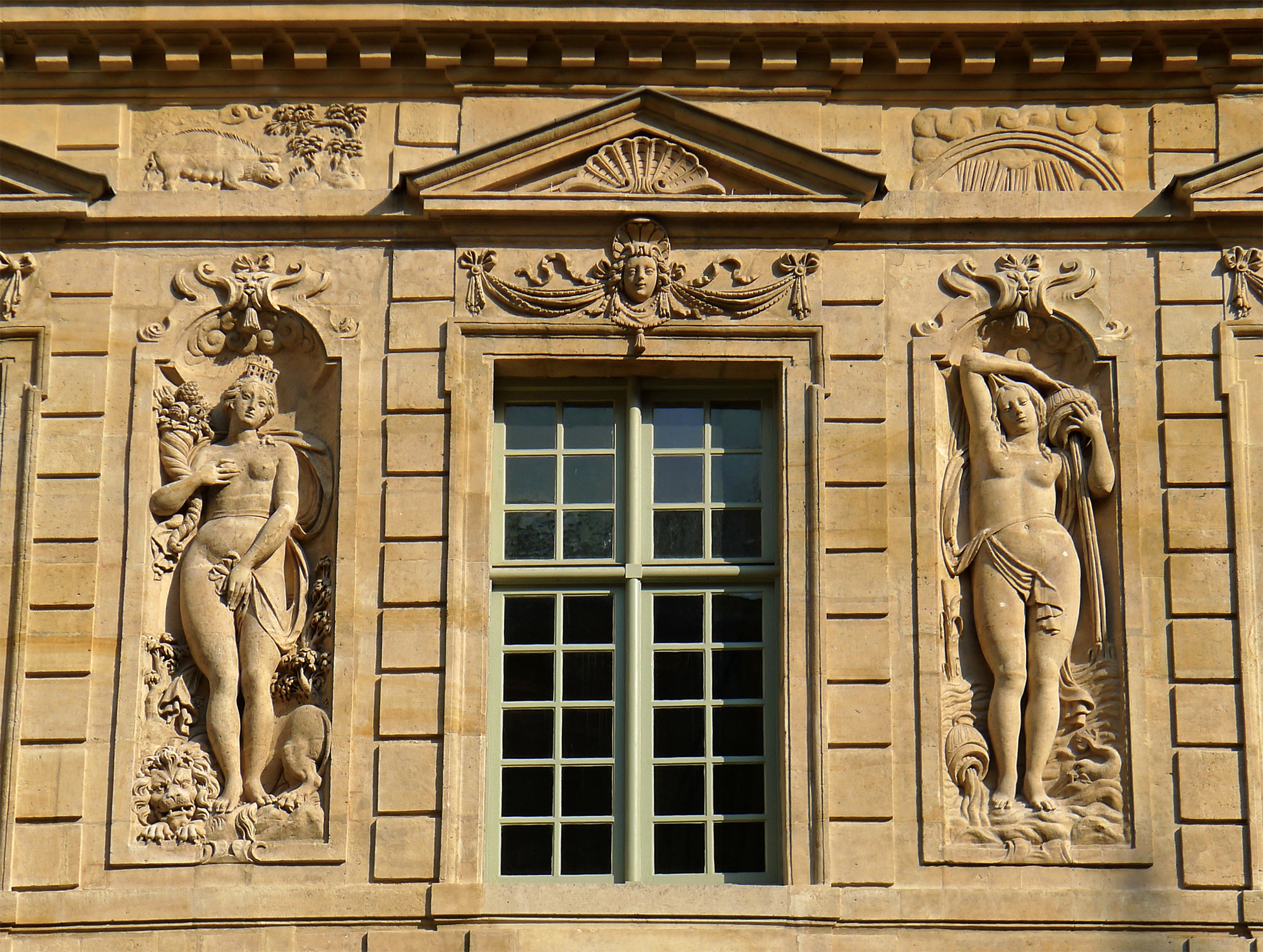
Allegorical bas-reliefs by Jean Goujon; on the left, Fall, on the right, Winter.

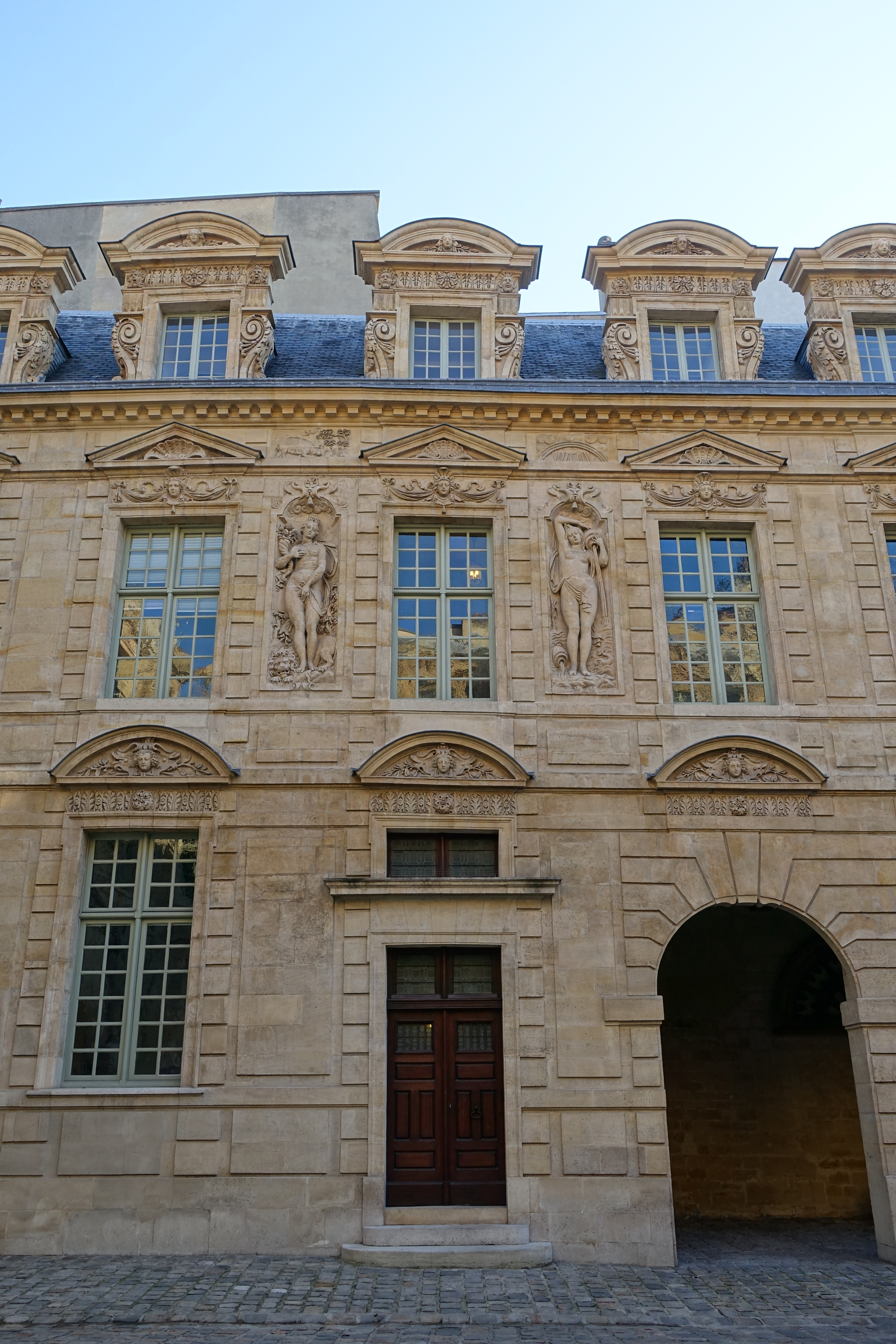
Detail of the east gallery.

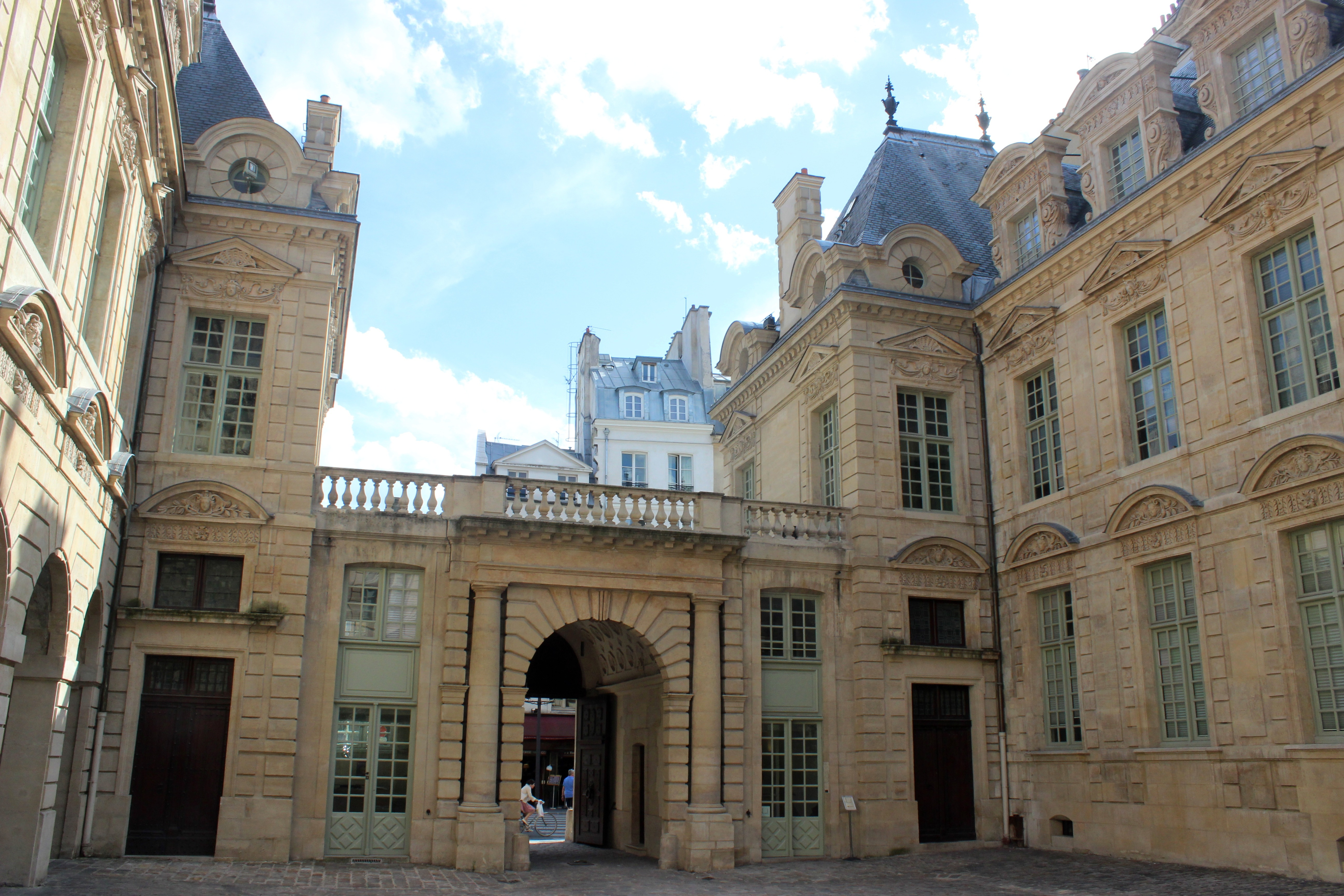
Main portal from the courtyard

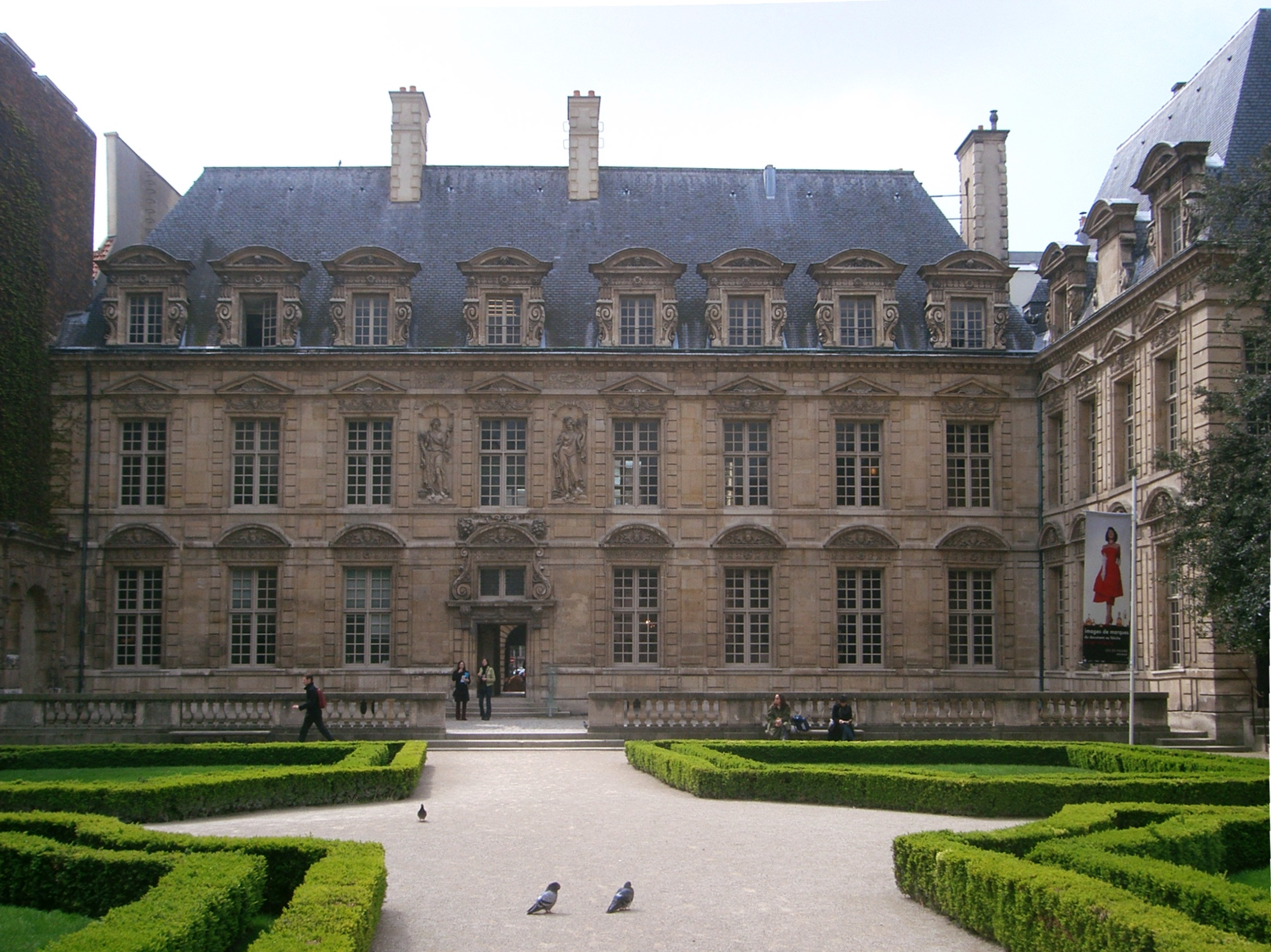
Nord façade, facing the garden,

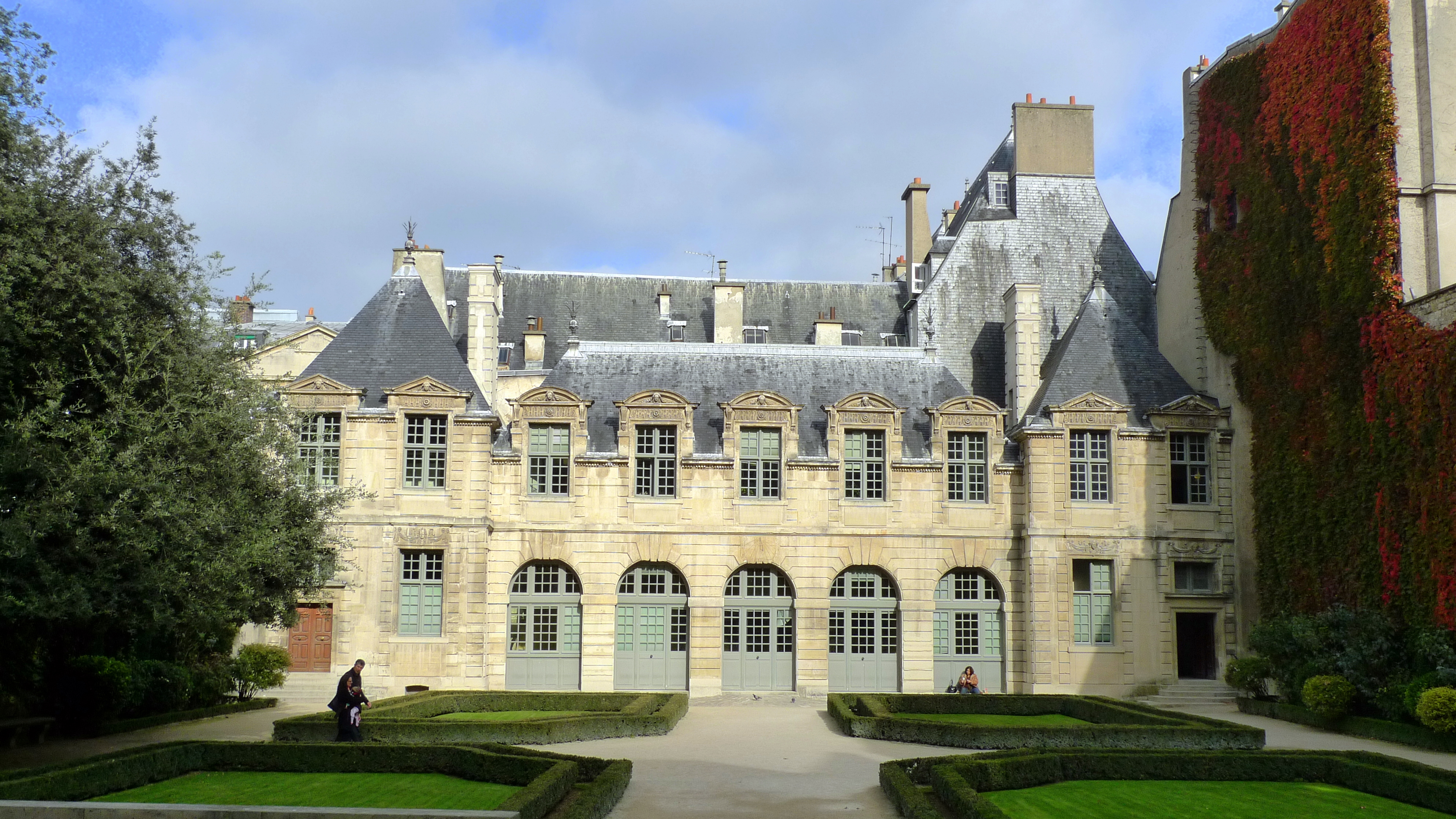
Garden and orangery

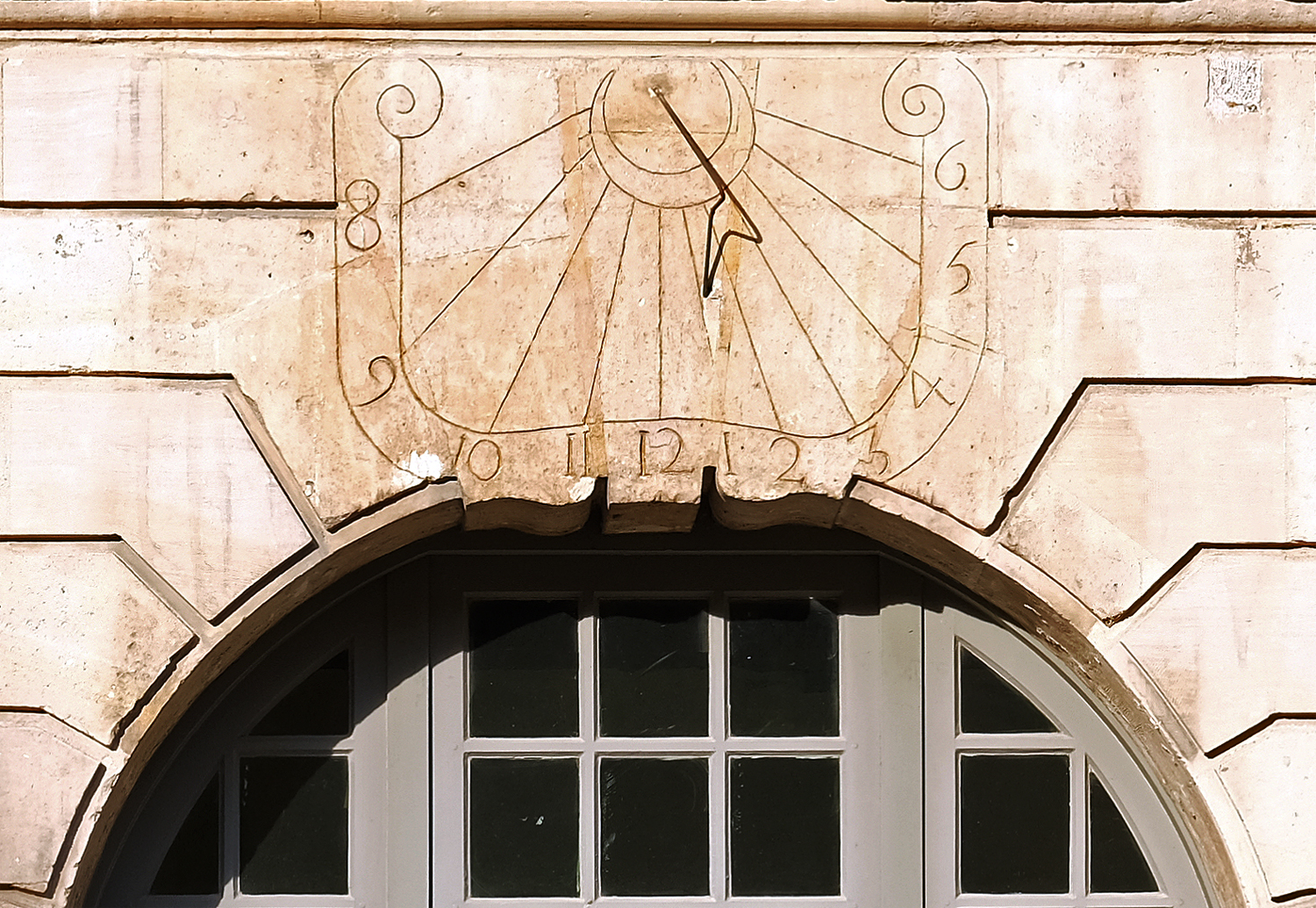
The orangery's sundial
