= Château de Nérac =

Castle in southwest France

Coordinates: 44°8′7″N 0°20′24″E

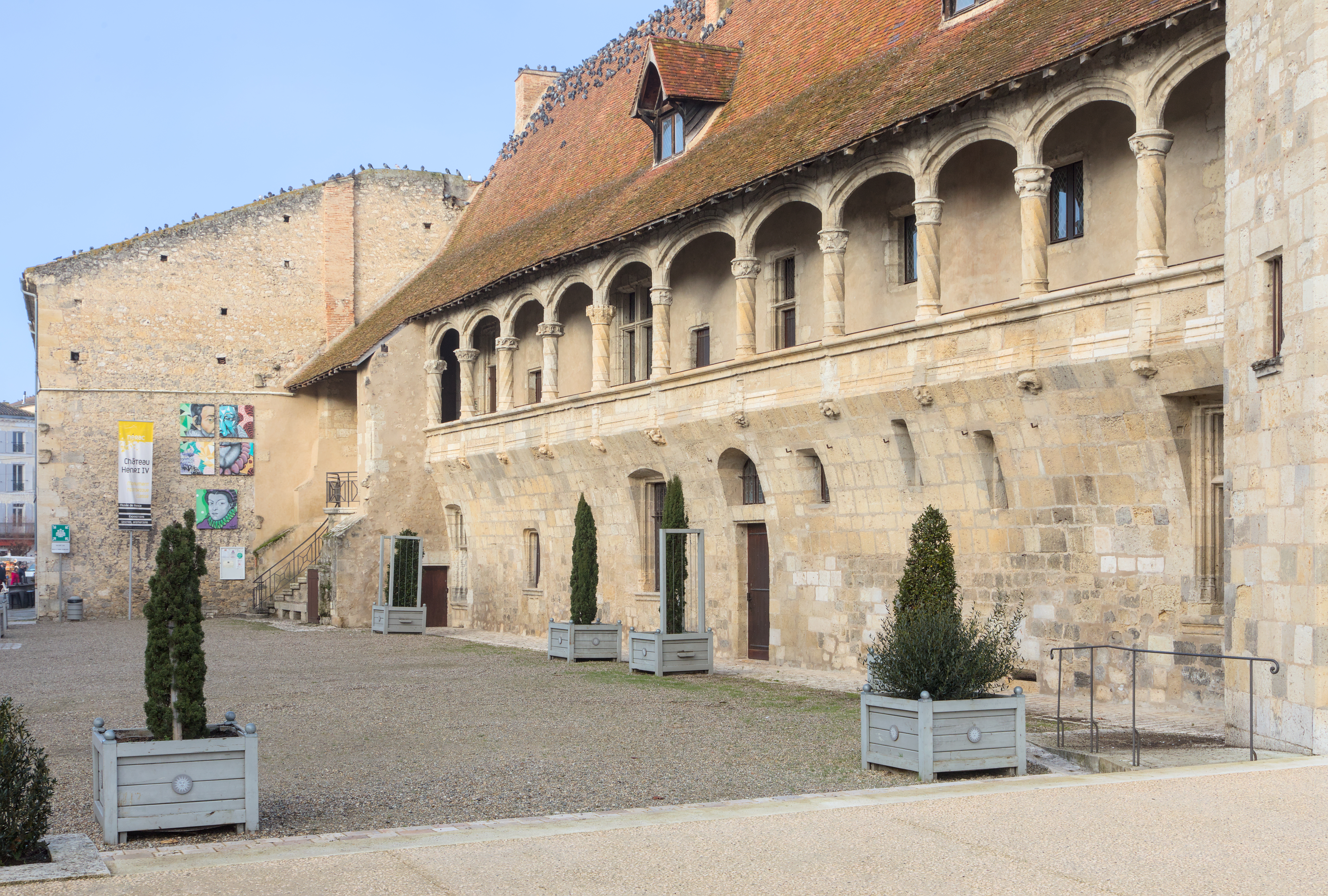
The Château de Nérac.

The Château de Nérac is a castle in the Lot-et-Garonne département in southwest France. An edifice of the French Renaissance style, it was finished during the reign of Jeanne d'Albret, Queen of Navarre, daughter of Marguerite d'Angoulème who was also Marguerite de Navarre by her marriage to Henry II of Navarre.

The castle has been listed as a Monument historique since 1862 by the French Ministry of Culture.

== Position ==
The castle overlooks the Baïse river, a tributary the Garonne.

== History ==
A stately home belonging to Arsieu of Albian is mentioned in 1088 but the first mention of a castle on the site is that belonging to Amanieu VI of Albret (Labrit) in 1259. The castle was rebuilt between the 15th and 16th centuries by the House of Albret. The House of Albret became linked to the Kingdom of Navarre after his marriage to Queen Catherine of Navarre (Lescar, 1486) and his crowning jure uxoris as King Jean III of Navarre. The castle was the location of a vibrant court during the life of Jeanne d'Albret, Queen Jeanne III of Navarre, and the youth of Henry III of Navarre, the future Henry IV of France. In 1560, Queen Jeanne III and her court converted to reformed religion after the meeting of Theodore de Bèze, and they welcomed a number of artists, such as Clément Marot.

After the coronation of Henry III of Navarre as King Henry IV of France, the castle was deserted. It was partially destroyed in 1651 by Henry of Lorraine, Duke of Mayenne, after the town revolted against king Louis XIII and then dismantled during the French Revolution, excepting the northern part, which is now a museum.

== Gallery ==
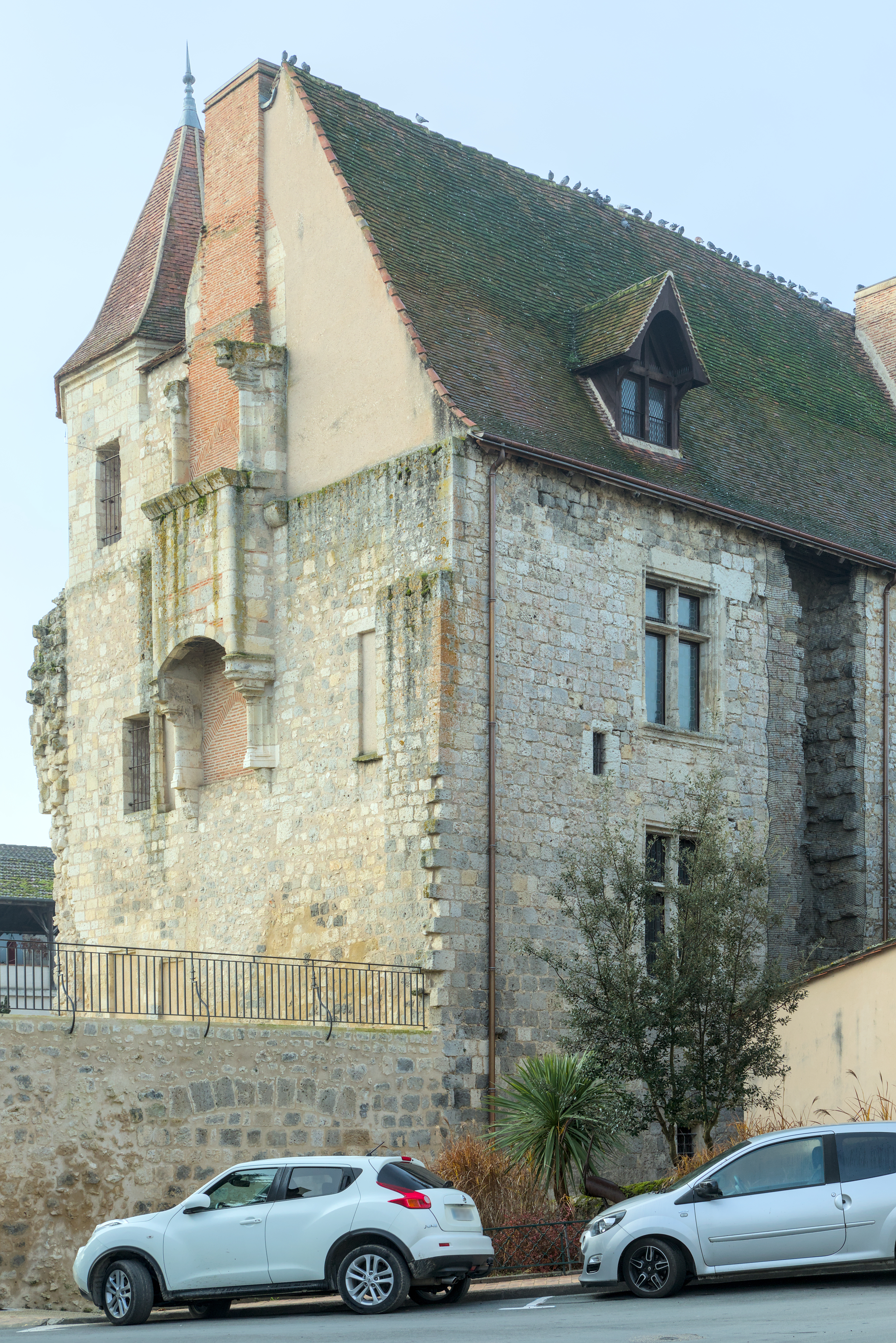

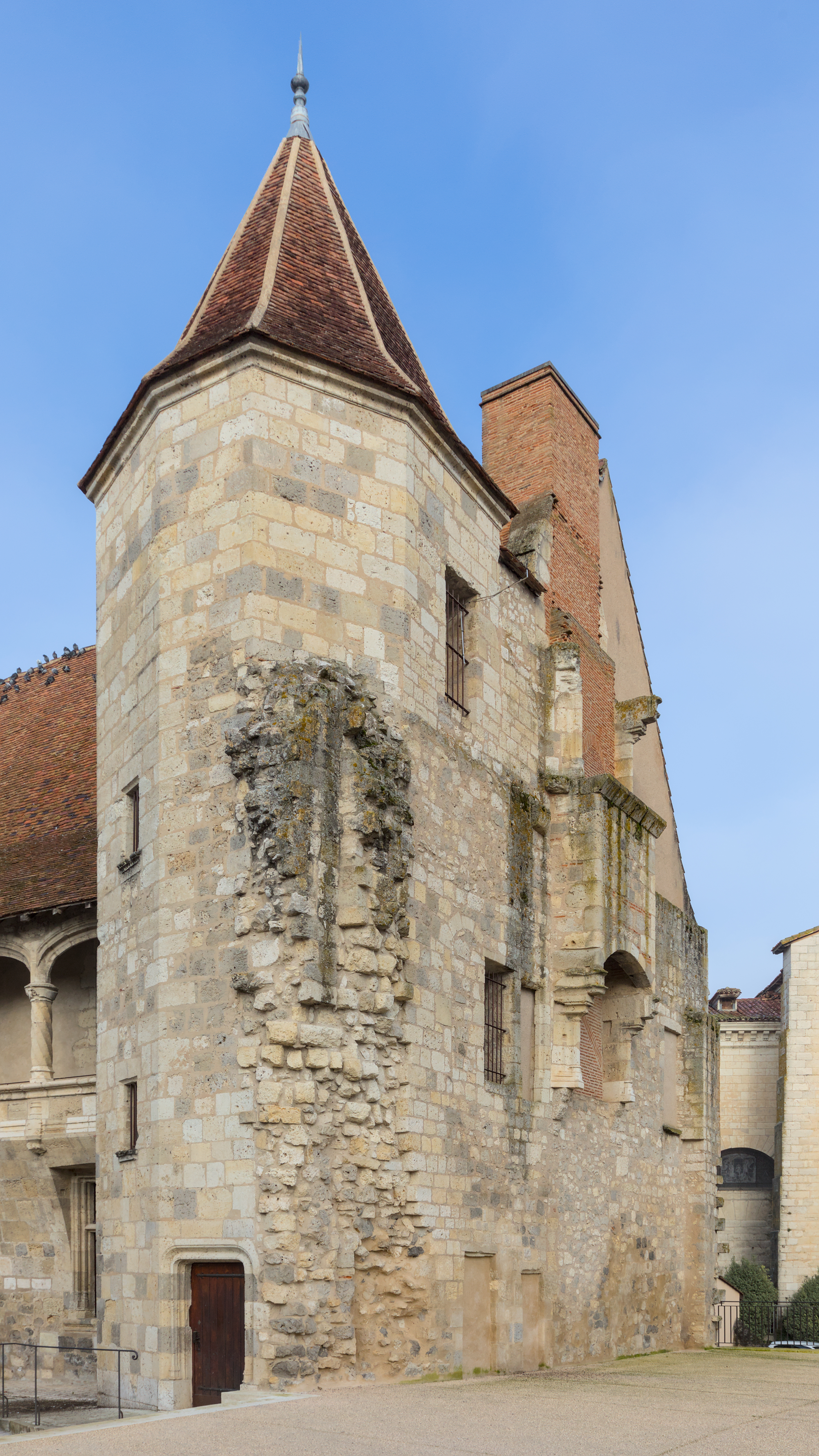

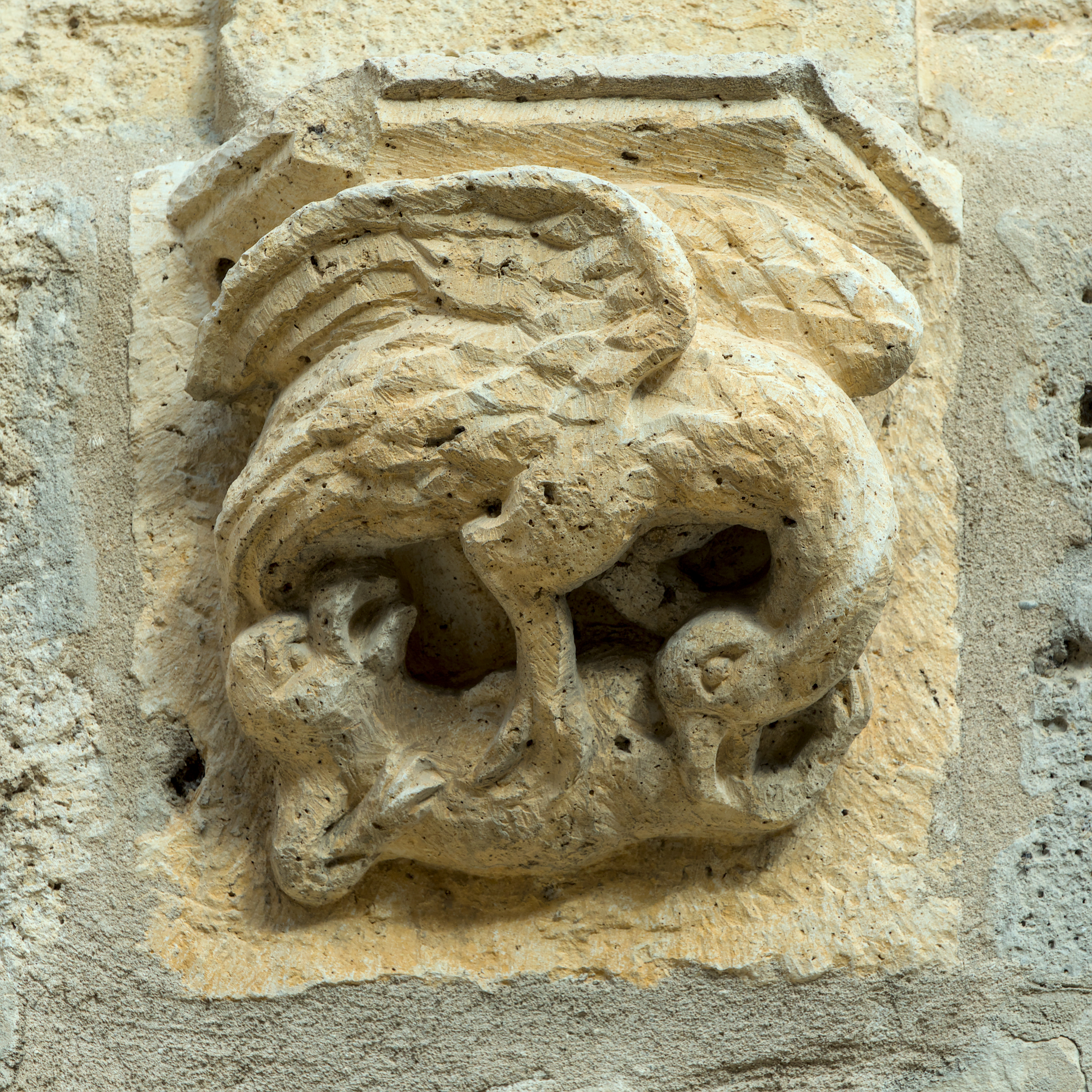

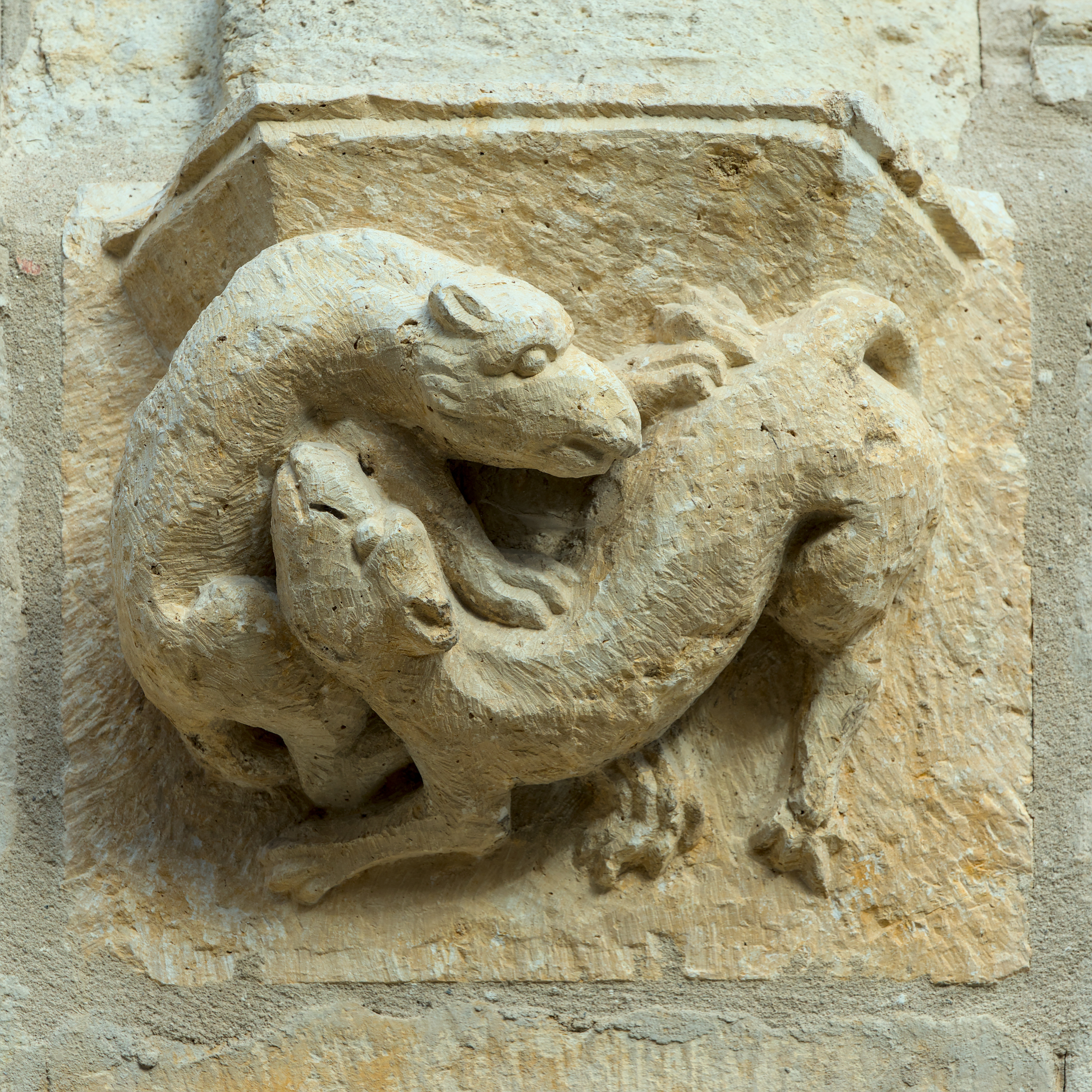

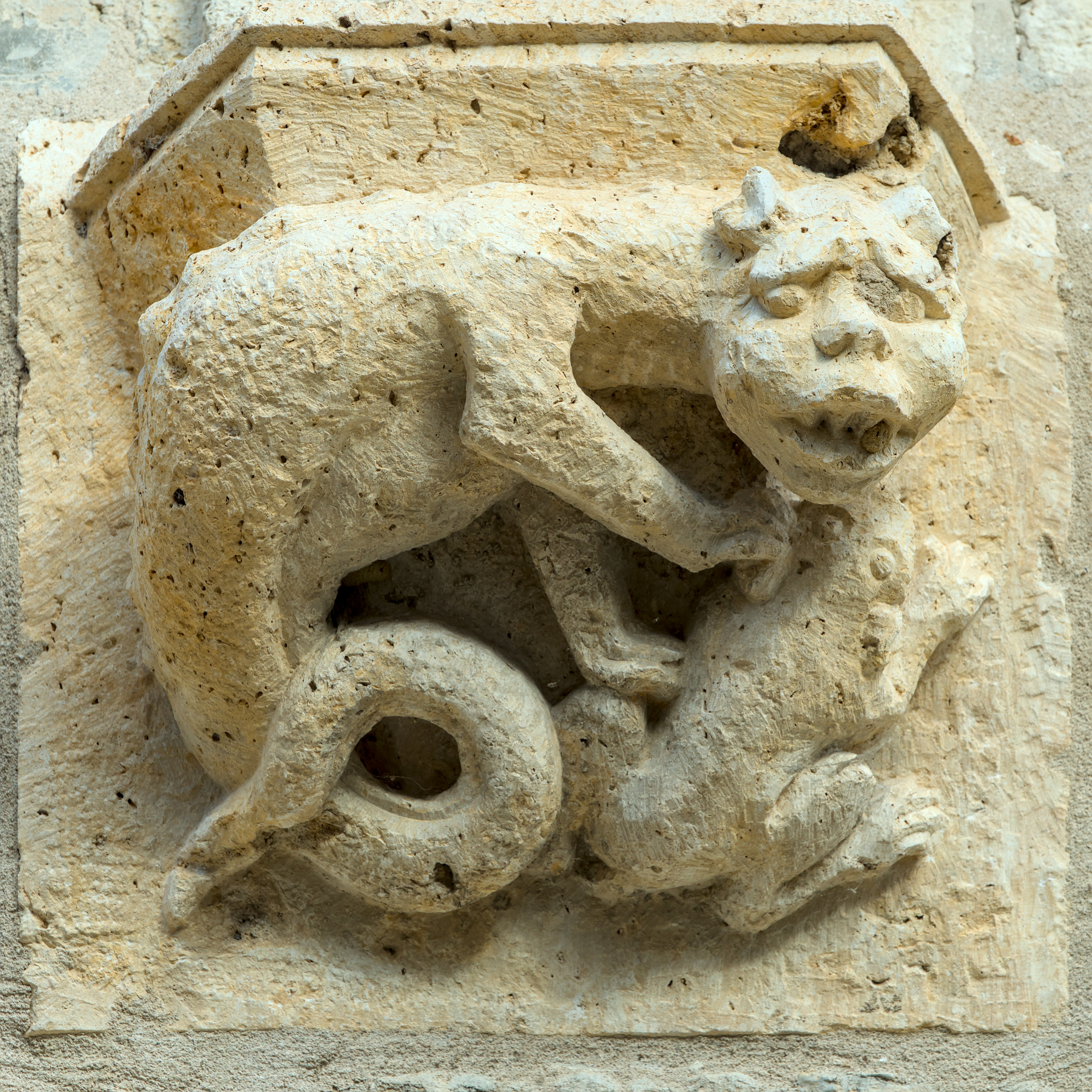

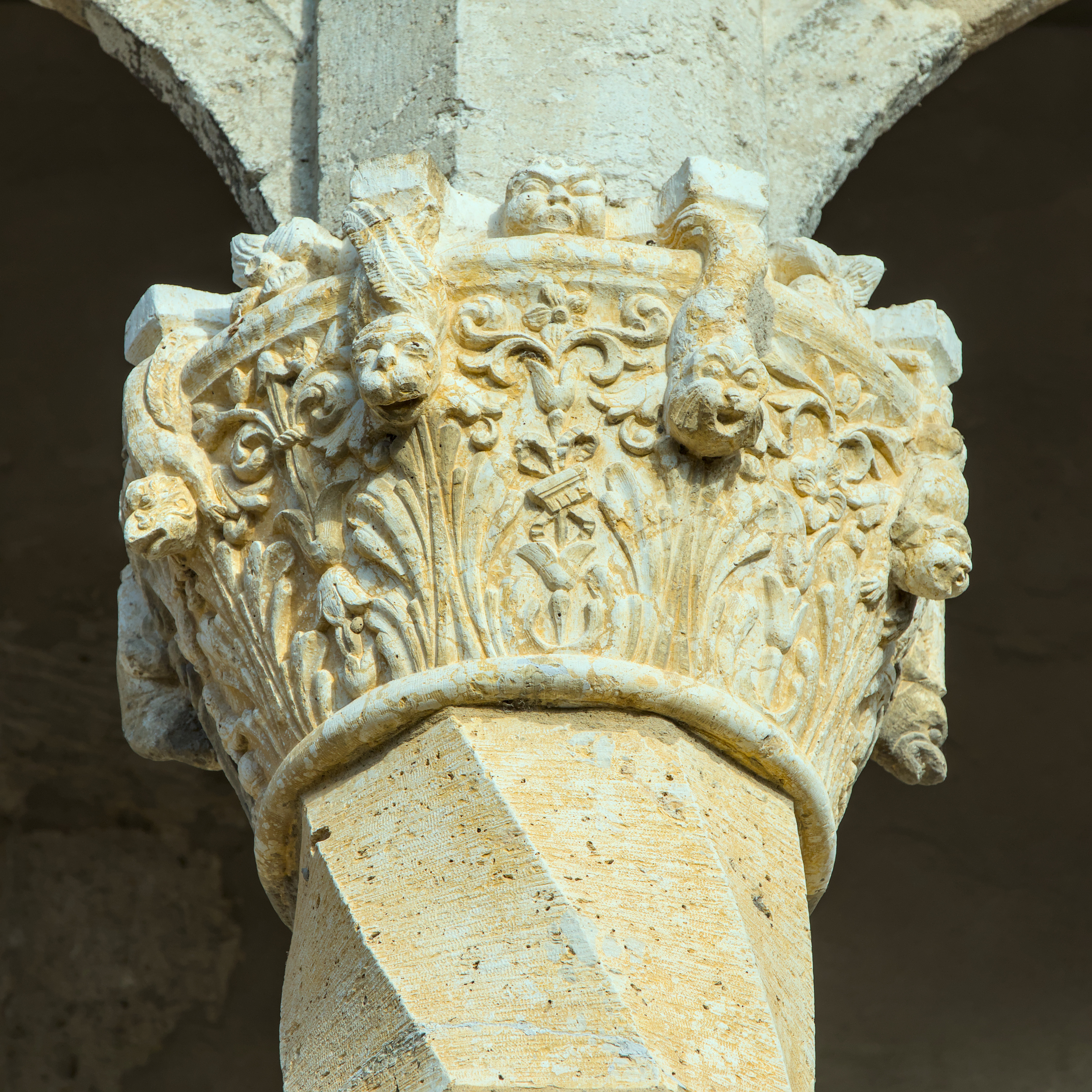

== See also ==
- List of castles in France
