= Androuet du Cerceau =

French architect family

Androuet du Cerceau was a family of French architects and designers active in the 16th and early 17th century.

Family members include:

- Jacques I Androuet du Cerceau (1510–1584), architect, designer, and engraver
- Baptiste Androuet du Cerceau (1544/47–1590), architect who designed the Pont Neuf, son of Jacques I
- Jacques II Androuet du Cerceau (1550–1614), architect, son of Jacques I
- Charles Androuet du Cerceau (died 1600), architect and engineer, son of Jacques I
- Salomon de Brosse (1571–1626), architect, grandson of Jacques I
- Jean Androuet du Cerceau (ca 1585–1649), architect and engineer, son of Baptiste
- Paul Androuet du Cerceau (1623–1710), goldsmith and engraver, grandson of Jacques II
- Gabriel-Guillaume Androuet du Cerceau (fl 1697–1743), architect, designer, and painter; grandson of Jacques II

== See also ==
- Catherine de' Medici's building projects
