= Jean Baptiste Androuet du Cerceau =

French architect under Henri III & Henry IV

Jean Baptiste Androuet du Cerceau (1544/47–1590) was a French architect who designed the Pont Neuf (1579), spanning the Seine, Paris, and became supervisor of the royal works under Henri III and Henri IV, including the Louvre. Several hôtels particuliers are ascribed to him. The Hôtel d'Angoulême, the Hôtel de Lamoignon (1584), which houses the Historical Library of the City of Paris, and the Hôtel de Mayenne (rue St-Antoine in the Marais). The Hôtel de Mayenne, with rhythmically varied dormer windows set in a high slate roof, has the pediments of its piano nobile windows superposed on the frieze above.

According to Benezit, Reynaud presumed that Paul Androuet du Cerceau, a French goldsmith and engraver, was Jean Baptiste's son, but Paul is now thought to be the grandson of Jacques II Androuet du Cerceau.

== See also ==
- Androuet du Cerceau for the family

== Sources ==
- Baldus, Eduoard. Oeuvre de Jacques Androuet dit du Cerceau. Meubles. Paris; Edouard Baldus: c. 1880
- Benezit Dictionary of Artists (2006). Paris: Gründ. ISBN 9782700030709.
- Miller, Naomi (1996). "Du Cerceau. French family of artists.", vol. 9, pp. 350–354, in The Dictionary of Art, edited by Jane Turner, reprinted with minor corrections in 1998. ISBN 9781884446009.
