= Jacques I Androuet du Cerceau =

French designer

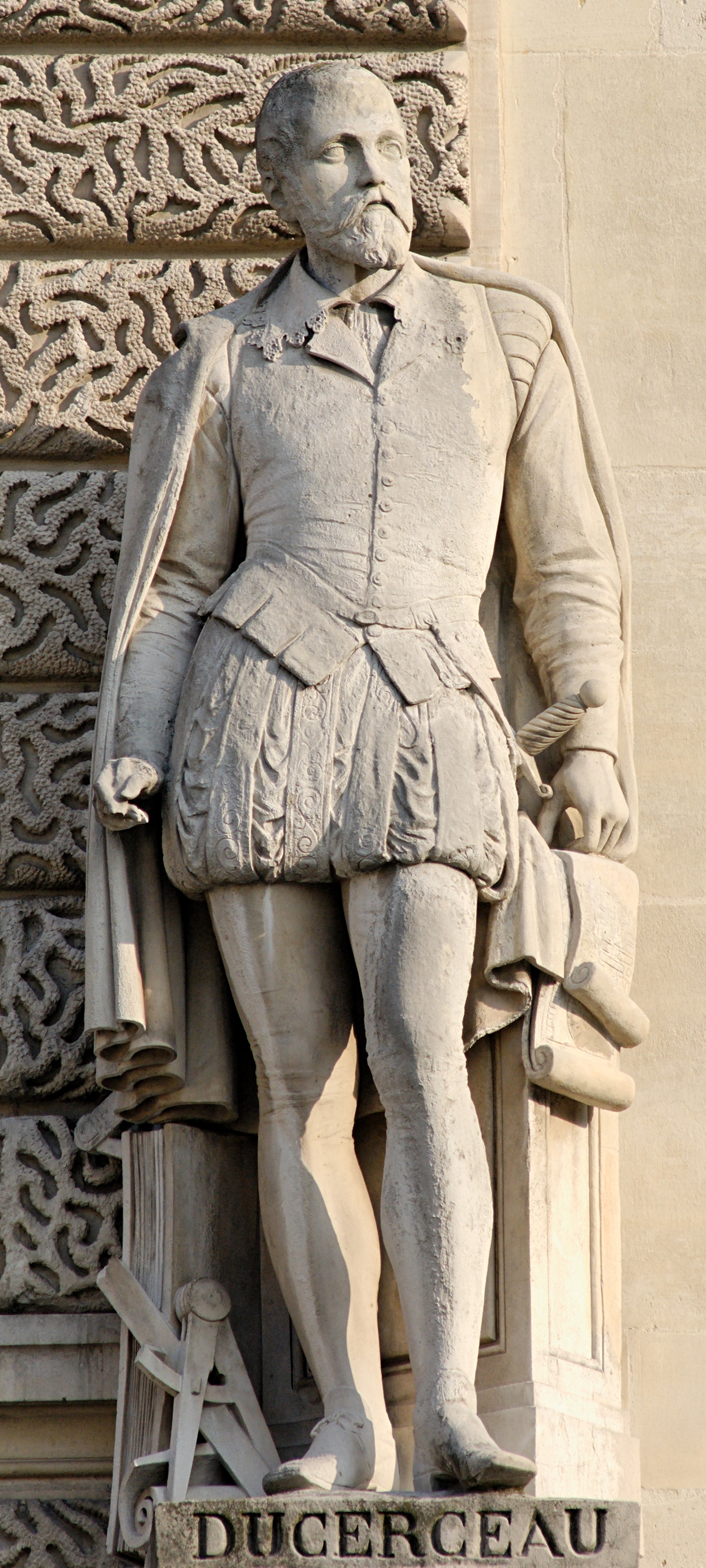
Jacques I Androuet du Cerceau by Georges Diebolt (Louvre)

Jacques I Androuet du Cerceau, also given as Du Cerceau, DuCerceau, or Ducerceau (1510–1584) was a well-known French designer of architecture, ornament, furniture, metalwork and other decorative designs during the 16th century, and the founder of the Androuet du Cerceau family. He introduced Renaissance architecture to France with the assistance of Pierre Lescot, Philibert Delorme and Jean Bullant. Though he was referred to by contemporaries as architecte and was even appointed architecte du roi, he is remembered especially for his suites of engravings produced from 1549 (beginning with a suite of Triumphal arches) from his printshop in Orléans.

Androuet was born in Paris, but worked in Orléans until 1559, when he returned to Paris, where he produced his notable Livre d'architecture (dedicated to Henri II). In 1569, under the pressures of the French Wars of Religion, Jacques I Androuet du Cerceau fled to the Huguenot stronghold of Montargis, the seat of Renée de France, duchess of Ferrara, daughter of Louis XII; the château featured strongly in his best-known work, the folio volumes of Les plus excellents bastiments de France (1576, second volume 1579). He died in Annecy.

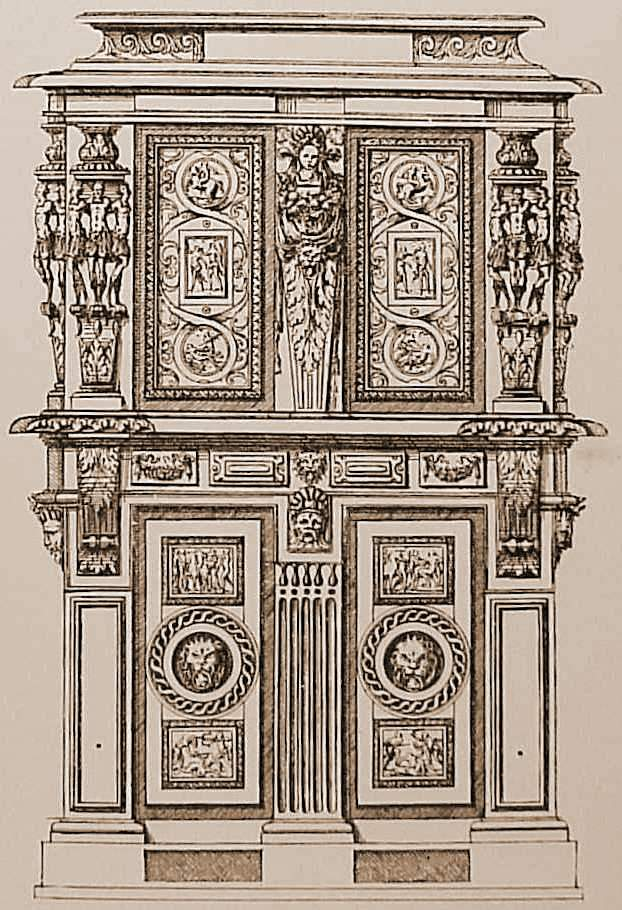
Engraved design for a cabinet, by Jacques I Androuet du Cerceau, c. 1550s: such a cabinet would have been executed in contrasting walnut and ebony, its top a low plinth for sculpture or a display of silver

His fine engravings of French châteaux and the perspective views of their gardens— which he documented but did not design— and his extravagantly fanciful suites of engravings of decorative architectural elements and furniture, heavily loaded with sculptural ornament, were especially influential for the designers and luxury craftsmen of Antwerp, working in the style broadly called Northern Mannerism. In the 1570s he was back in Paris, working for Charles IX and Catherine de' Medici. Though documentation is lacking, and attribution to the author of a widely used patternbook is generally risky, he is credited with the designs of the châteaux of Verneuil, in Verneuil-en-Halatte, which was later purchased by Henri IV in 1600, and Charles IX's château of Charleval (demolished), where he was assisted by his son Baptiste.

The nickname "Cerceau" comes from the emblem of a ring that appears in lieu of a signature on engravings by Jacques Androuet.

Answering the pressure of demand for authentic "Henri II" furniture designs in the 1880s, suites of designs by Jacques Androuet du Cerceau for chimneypieces, furniture and arabesque ornament were reproduced by the new technique of heliogravure. In the years after 1906, the detailed bird's-eye-view perspective engravings of Jacques Androuet enabled the patterned parterres of the Château de Villandry to be restored to their 16th-century appearance.

The standard work on Jacques Androuet du Cerceau the Elder remains the 1887 monograph of Henry de Geymüller.

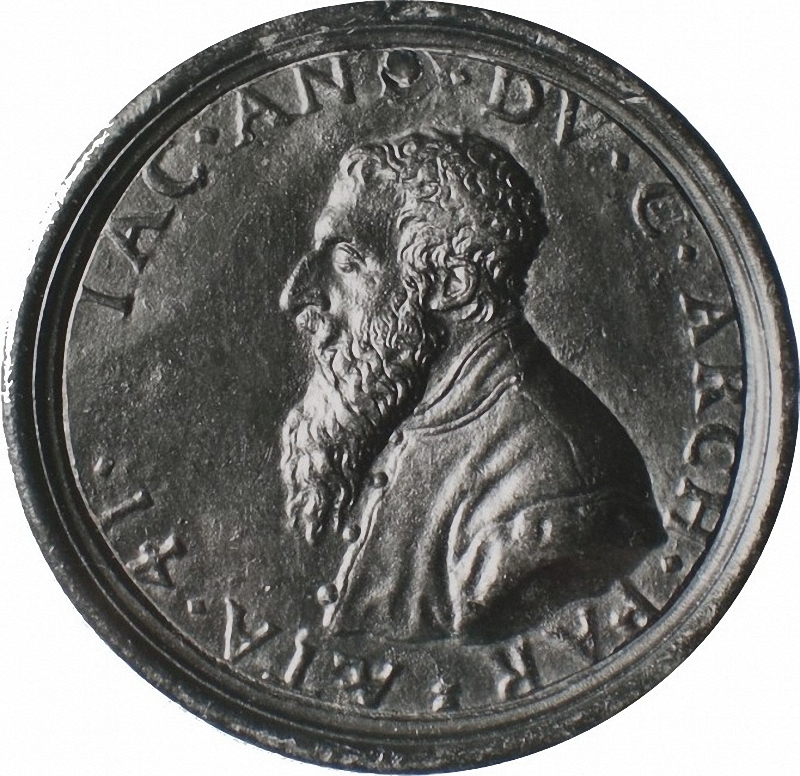
Jacques I Androuet du Cerceau

== See also ==
- Catherine de' Medici's building projects
- Androuet du Cerceau for the family
