= Les Halles =

Location of former food market and now a modern mall in Paris, France

Westfield Forum des Halles
- Canopy over the mall
- Location: Paris (1st arrondissement), France
- Opened: 1979, reconstruction by 2018
- Owner: Unibail-Rodamco-Westfield (mall), RATP (transit hub of Châtelet–Les Halles)
- Num. of stores: 168
- Floor area: 60,000 square metres
- Parking: 2,100 spaces
- Public transit: Châtelet; Châtelet–Les Halles; Les Halles
- Website: www.westfield.com/france/forumdeshalles

Les Halles (French pronunciation: [le al]; 'The Halls') was Paris's central fresh food market. It last operated on 12 January 1973 and was replaced by an underground shopping centre and a park. The unpopular modernist development was demolished in 2010 and replaced by the Westfield Forum des Halles, a modern shopping mall built largely underground and topped by an undulating 2.5 hectare canopy. The mall sees around 50 million visitors every year, making it the busiest in France as of 2019. It is directly connected to the massive RER and métro transit hub of Châtelet–Les Halles, Paris's busiest station.

== History ==
Paris in the first third of the 14th century, with les Halles towards the top

=== The market of the Little Fields ===
In the 11th century, a market grew up by a cemetery to the northwest of Paris in an area called the Little Fields (Champeaux). This was mainly a dry goods and money changing market. A bishop briefly took control of the market before sharing control with Louis VI in 1137. In 1183, Philip Augustus took full control of the market and built two market halls – halles – to protect the textiles. He also built walls around the market, including land which had recently been confiscated from exiled Jews that originally belonged to the church. When he then built walls around the city, these embraced the market, which quickly became the city's largest (and, over time, went from being at the edge of the city to at its center). Officially, it would remain a dry goods market for centuries, but food stalls soon grew up around the main buildings and by the 15th century food prices at les Halles were being cited as significant for the whole city.

The market experienced various phases of expansion over the coming centuries and was rebuilt multiple times. While non-food commodities such as cloth remained part of the trade, an increasing number of halls were built explicitly for food, which ultimately became the primary driver of congestion in the increasingly cramped space.

=== The wholesale market ===
The church of Saint-Eustache was constructed in the 16th century. The circular Halle aux Blés (Corn Exchange), designed by Nicolas Le Camus de Mézières, was built between 1763 and 1769 at the west end of Les Halles. Its circular central court was later covered with a dome, and it was converted into the Bourse de Commerce in 1889.

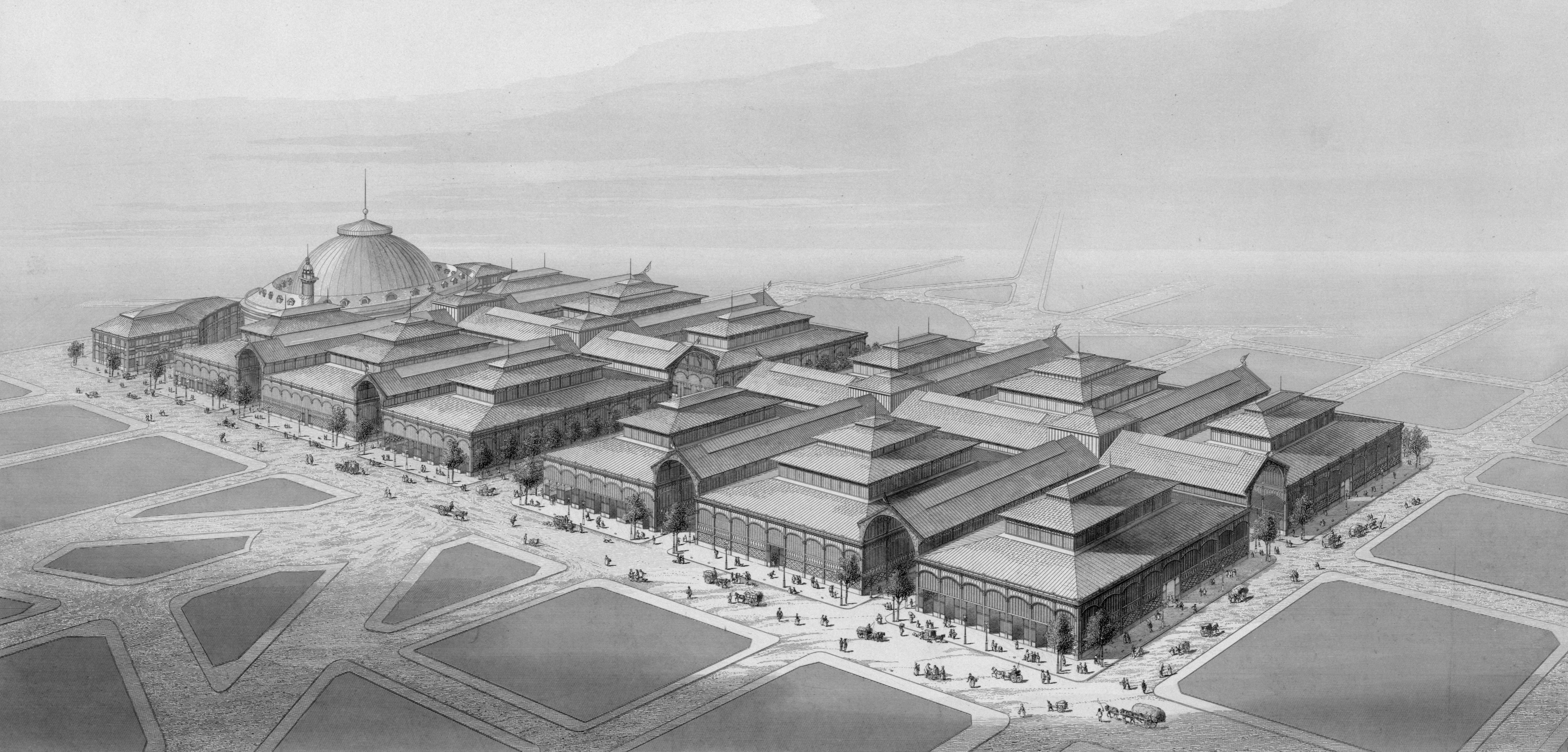
Design of Les Halles in 1863, By Victor Baltard.

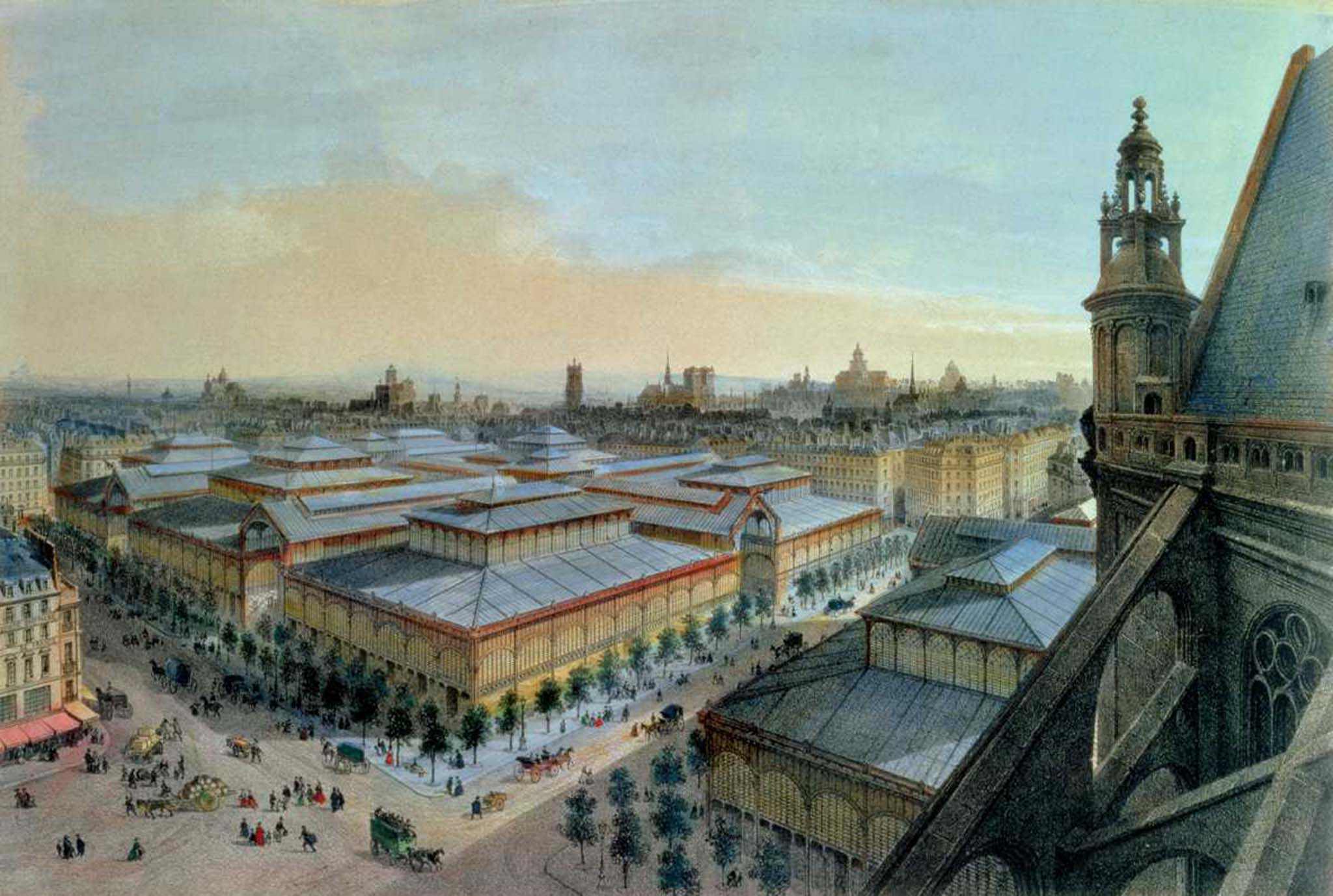
View of Les Halles from Saint-Eustache in 1870

In the 1850s, Victor Baltard designed the famous glass and iron structure which would house les Halles for over a century and became one of the sights of Paris; this would last until the 1970s. Having become entirely a food market, the remodeled market was known as the "Belly of Paris", as Émile Zola called it in his 1873 novel Le Ventre de Paris, which is set in the busy marketplace of the 19th century.

=== Major conversion ===
Unable to compete in the new market economy and in need of massive repairs, the colourful ambience once associated with the bustling area of merchant stalls disappeared in 1973, when Les Halles was demolished (fruit, flower and vegetable markets had moved in 1969, and only the butchers at the meat markets remained); the wholesale market was relocated to the suburb of Rungis. Two of the glass and cast iron market pavilions were dismantled and re-erected elsewhere; one in the Paris suburb of Nogent-sur-Marne, and the other in Yokohama, Japan; the rest were destroyed. The site was chosen to host the station Châtelet–Les-Halles, the point of convergence of the RER, a new network of express underground railway lines through the city. Three lines leading out of the city to the south, east and west were to be extended and connected in the new underground station. For several years, the site of the markets was an enormous open pit, nicknamed le trou des Halles ("the hole of Les Halles"), regarded as an eyesore at the foot of the historic church of Saint-Eustache. The construction on Paris's new central railway hub was completed in 1977.

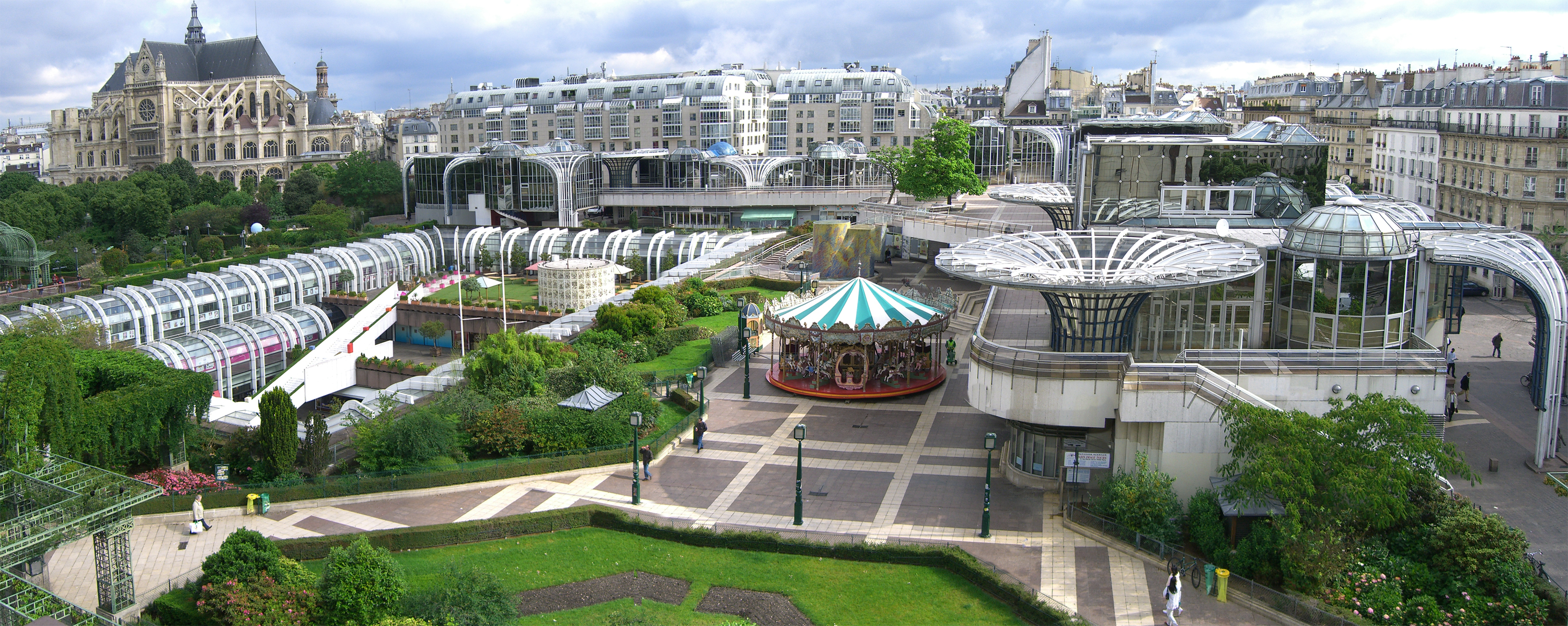
The modernist first incarnation of Forum des Halles, in 2007

The Forum des Halles, a partially underground multiple story commercial and shopping centre, designed by Claude Vasconi and Georges Pencreac'h, opened at the east end of the site on 4 September 1979 in the presence of the Mayor of Paris Jacques Chirac. A public garden covering 4 hectares (9.9 acres) opened in 1986. Many of the surrounding streets were pedestrianized.

The demolition of Baltard's market hall structure and the design of the spaces that replaced it proved highly controversial over the subsequent decades. The critic Oliver Wainwright called the razing "one of the worst acts of urban vandalism of the century", and that the place became a "national embarrassment" with the park "a magnet for drug dealing". Historian Donato Severo called the events "the most violent act ever committed against the heritage of Paris", with architect Lloyd Alter adding that the replacement complex was "nearly universally reviled for its mean spirit".

=== 21st century redesign ===
In 2002, Mayor Bertrand Delanoë announced that the City of Paris would begin public consultations regarding the remodeling of the area, calling Les Halles "a soulless, architecturally bombastic concrete jungle".

A design competition for the Forum and gardens was held, with entries from Jean Nouvel, Winy Maas, David Mangin, and Rem Koolhaas. Mangin's design for the gardens, which proposed replacing the landscaped mounds and paths of the 1980s design with a simplified pattern of east–west pedestrian promenades and a large central lawn, was selected. The plan also included extending the pedestrianized area further east to include all the streets bordering the gardens. Another competition was held for the redesign of the Forum. Ten teams submitted plans, and the proposal by Patrick Berger and Jacques Anziutti was selected in 2007. Their design included a large undulating glass canopy covering the redesigned Forum. STIF and RATP began plans for the remodeling of the Châtelet-Les-Halles station in 2007, and the following year Berger and Anziutti were awarded a contract for redesign of the station.

The station redesign included new entrances on Rue Berger, Rue Rambuteau, and Place Marguerite de Navarre, an expanded RER concourse, and improved pedestrian circulation. Construction began in 2010 on the gardens, Forum, and station. The canopy over the Forum was inaugurated in April 2016; construction finished in 2018.

== In popular culture ==
- Scenes of the old Les Halles marketplace can be seen in the films Bonjour Tristesse (1958) and in Charade and Irma la Douce (both 1963).
- Part of the actual demolition of the site is featured in the 1974 film Touche pas à la femme blanche (Don't Touch the White Woman!), which iconoclastically restages General Custer's 'last stand' in a distinctly French context in and around the area.
- In 1977, Roberto Rossellini made a 54-minute documentary film that testified to the public's response to the demolition of Les Halles and the construction of Centre Georges Pompidou. "The result was a sceptical vision rather than a pure celebration."
- The 1998 action movie Ronin, well known for its famous car chase scenes, used the Les Halles tunnel network as one of the locations for the final emblematic pursuit across Paris.
- The open-air market and Baltard's pavilions were digitally reconstructed for the 2004 film Un long dimanche de fiançailles (A Very Long Engagement), which was set after the First World War.
- The Revolution-era version of Les Halles and Halles aux Blés can be found in the 2014 video game Assassin's Creed Unity, where the observational tower built by Catherine de Médici beside the pavilion acts as the district's synchronisation point. It serves as the location for a mission, which results in an explosion and the severe burning of the interior.
- In the second season of The Monkees tv series, the episode "Monkees In Paris" in 1968, Les Halles was used as one of the many locations of that episode.

== Bibliography ==
- in French: Bertrand Lemoine, Les Halles de Paris : L'histoire d'un lieu, les péripéties d'une reconstruction, la succession des projets, l'architecture d'un monument, l'enjeu d'une cité, L'Équerre, coll. « Les Laboratoires de l'imaginaire » (n^{o} 1), Paris, 283 p. (ISBN 2-86425-008-X); in Italian: Le Halles di Parigi: La storia di un luogo, le peripezie della ricostruzione, la successione dei progetti, l'architettura di un monumento, trad. Giuliana Aldi Pompili, Jaca Book, coll. « Di fronte e attraverso / Saggi di Architettura » (n^{o} 96), Milan, 1984 (ISBN 88-16-40096-X)
