= Jacques Molinos =

French architect (1743–1831)

Jacques Molinos (4 June 1743 – 19 February 1831) was a French architect.

== Biography ==
Molinos was born in Lyon and studied in Paris at the Royal Academy of Architecture under Jacques-François Blondel.

The Halle aux blés (Corn Exchange), on the site of the present Bourse de commerce was designed by Nicolas Le Camus de Mézières with a circular central courtyard and a double staircase. In 1782, François-Joseph Bélanger proposed to add an iron cupola to cover to courtyard, but his plan was rejected. Instead, from 1782 to 1783, a wooden dome was built to a design by Jacques-Guillaume Legrand and Jacques Molinos based on the principles defined by Philibert de l'Orme. On 16 October 1802, the cupola was destroyed by fire. Molinos and Jacques-Guillaume Legrand collaborated on the design of the Théâtre Feydeau (1789–1790, destroyed 1829).
