= Thomas Blaikie (gardener) =

Scottish gardener (1751–1838)

- Born: 11 February 1750; Corstorphine Hill
- Died: 19 July 1838 (aged 88); Paris
- Occupations: Botanist and gardener

Thomas Blaikie (11 February 1750 – 19 July 1838) was a Scottish botanist and gardener born on Corstorphine Hill, which was at the time just outside Edinburgh.

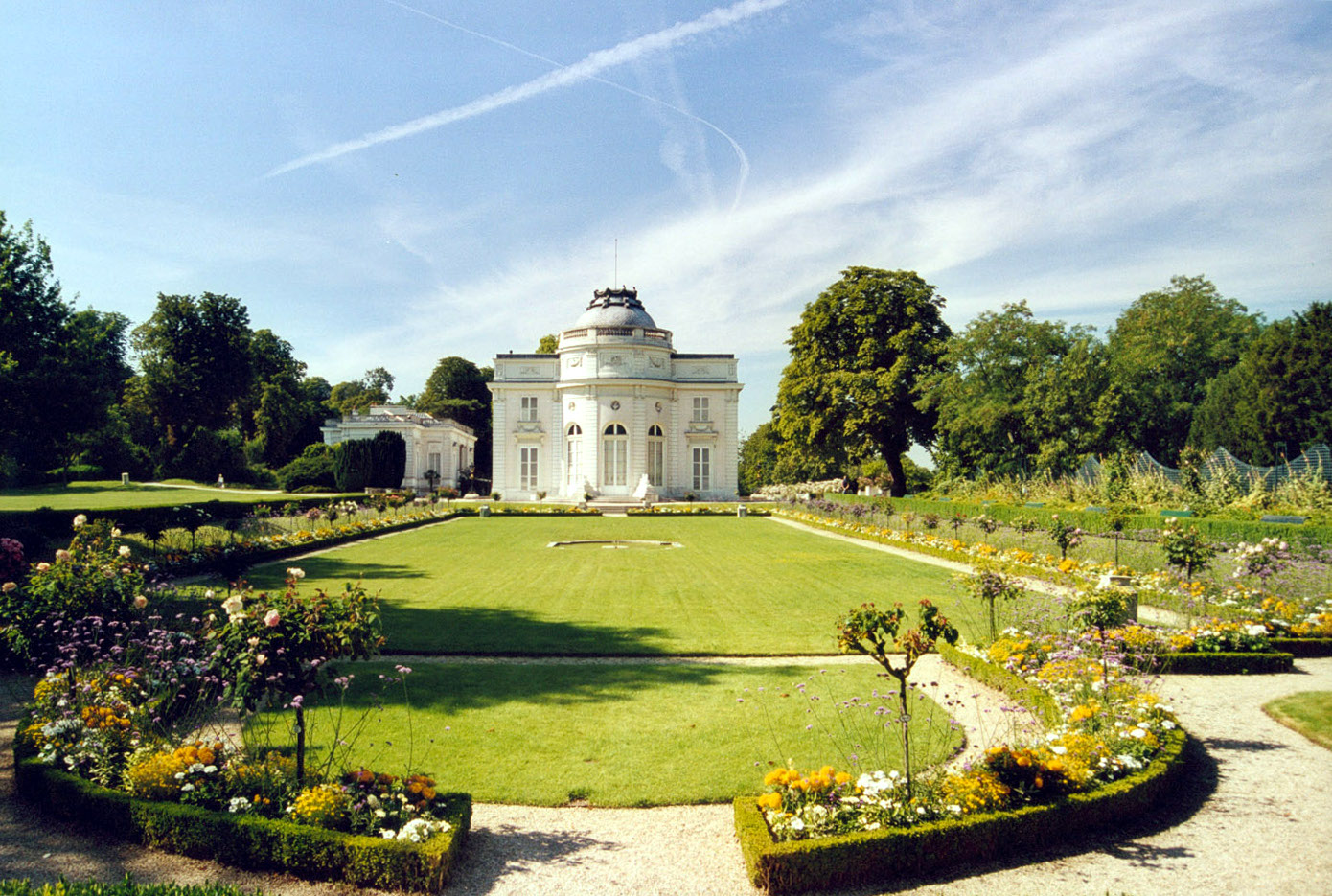
The Château de Bagatelle.

== Career ==
Between 1775 and 1776 he was tasked by John Fothergill and William Pitcairn with travelling the Alps to collect and record rare species of plants. Whilst there he met Voltaire and travelled with Michel-Gabriel Paccard, who received later fame for achieving the first ascent of Mont Blanc.

After briefly returning to Britain, Blaikie worked on the gardens of the Comte de Lauraguais in Normandy, before a failure to pay Blaikie ended his employment. From 1778 Blaikie passed into the employment of the Comte d'Artois, younger brother of Louis XVI and later to become Charles X. Blaikie designed the gardens of Bagatelle, modified by François-Joseph Bélanger to suit French tastes, and oversaw their planting.

Whilst continuing to work for the Comte d'Artois, Blaikie created a garden for Sophie Arnould, the renowned opera singer and a lover of Bélanger. In 1780 the Duc de Chartres, who was later to become the Duc d'Orléans and finally Philippe Égalité, commissioned Blaikie to design some of his gardens including the Winter Garden at the Parc Monceau.

The French Revolution financially ruined Blaikie with his previous employers unable to pay him, contracts drying up, his loss of money from rentes on the Hotel de Ville, and in 1792 his house being robbed with 50,000 francs worth of property lost. As a result, he was forced to return to work as a bailiff for the Comte de Lauraguais, whose successor he had similar disputes over pay with following the Restoration. In 1826 Blaikie received a royal pension of 600 francs per annum secured by the new Duc d'Orléans, the future Louis Philippe I.

Blaikie died in 1838 in his house on the rue de Vignes in Paris.

== See also ==
- Château de Bagatelle
