= Anne Victoire Dervieux =

French singer

- Born: 1752
- Died: 1826 (aged 73–74); Paris
- Occupations: Ballerina, opera singer and courtesan
- Spouse: François-Joseph Bélanger

Anne Victoire Dervieux (1752–1826) was a French ballerina, opera singer, and courtesan.

== Life ==
Dervieux was the daughter of a washer woman in Paris.

=== Stage career ===
She was engaged at the Paris Opera in 1765, (aged 13), where she was active as a ballet dancer before she retrained to become an opera singer. As a singer, she performed at the Concert Spirituel, and her greatest triumph was said to have been her performance in Pygmalion in 1772.

=== Courtesan ===
She attracted much fame for her parallel career as a courtesan. She has been referred to as the rival of Madeleine Guimard. Among her clients were Louis François Joseph, Prince of Conti and the brothers of Louis XVI, the count of Artois and the count de Provence; she also shared her client Charles, Prince of Soubise with Madeleine Guimard. Dervieux, as well as Guimard, were celebrities of their time and frequently portrayed in the scandal press.

=== Residence ===
She became known for her extravagant residence, a palace she had constructed in rue Chantereine Paris, filled with her valuable fine art collections. The building was originally designed by architect Alexandre-Théodore Brongniart and later re-worked by the architect François-Joseph Bélanger

=== Later life ===
Dervieux married François-Joseph Bélanger in 1794 and retired from her stage career as well as from her career as a courtesan. She adopted a girl around this time. She was imprisoned during The Terror of Robespierre, but avoided execution. Dervieux died in Paris in 1829.
