= Château de Bagatelle =

Neoclassical estate in the Bois de Boulogne park of Paris, France

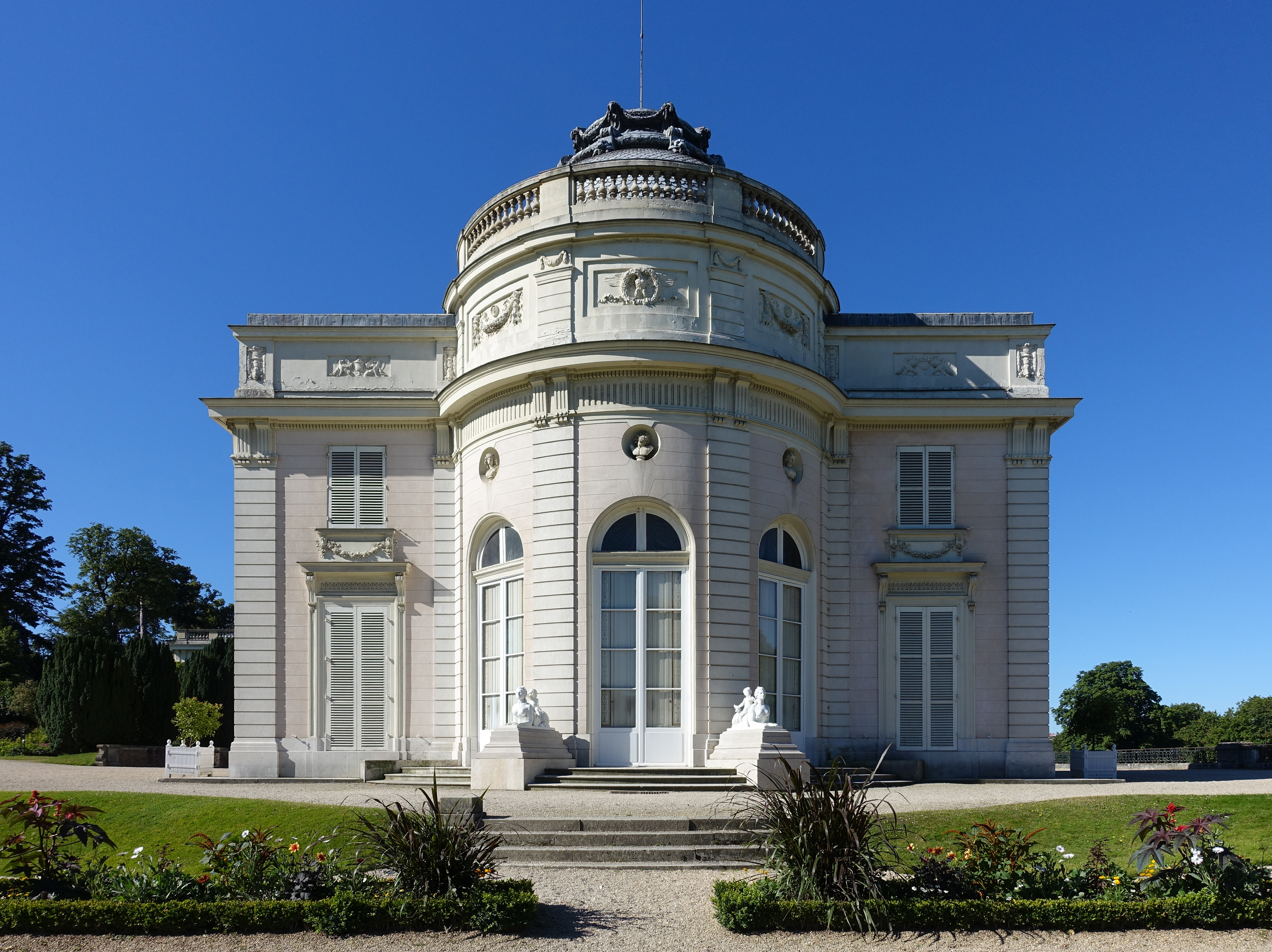
- The garden façade
- Interactive map of the Château de Bagatelle area

General information
- Type: Château
- Location: Bois de Boulogne, Paris, France
- Coordinates: 48°52′18″N 2°14′50″E
- Construction started: 1777
- Completed: 1777 (construction time: 63 days)
- Owner: Charles-Philippe de France, Comte d'Artois (most prominent former owner)

Design and construction
- Architect: François-Joseph Bélanger

The Château de Bagatelle (French pronunciation: [ʃato də baɡatɛl]), located in the Parc de Bagatelle in Paris, is a Neoclassical-style château with several French formal gardens, a rose garden and an orangerie. It is set on 59 acres (24 hectares) of grounds in French landscape style within the Bois de Boulogne, which is located in the 16th arrondissement of Paris.

The château also became famous as a reference point for the duel scene in the affaire: An Incident at the Opera Ball on Mardi Gras in 1778.

== Origins ==
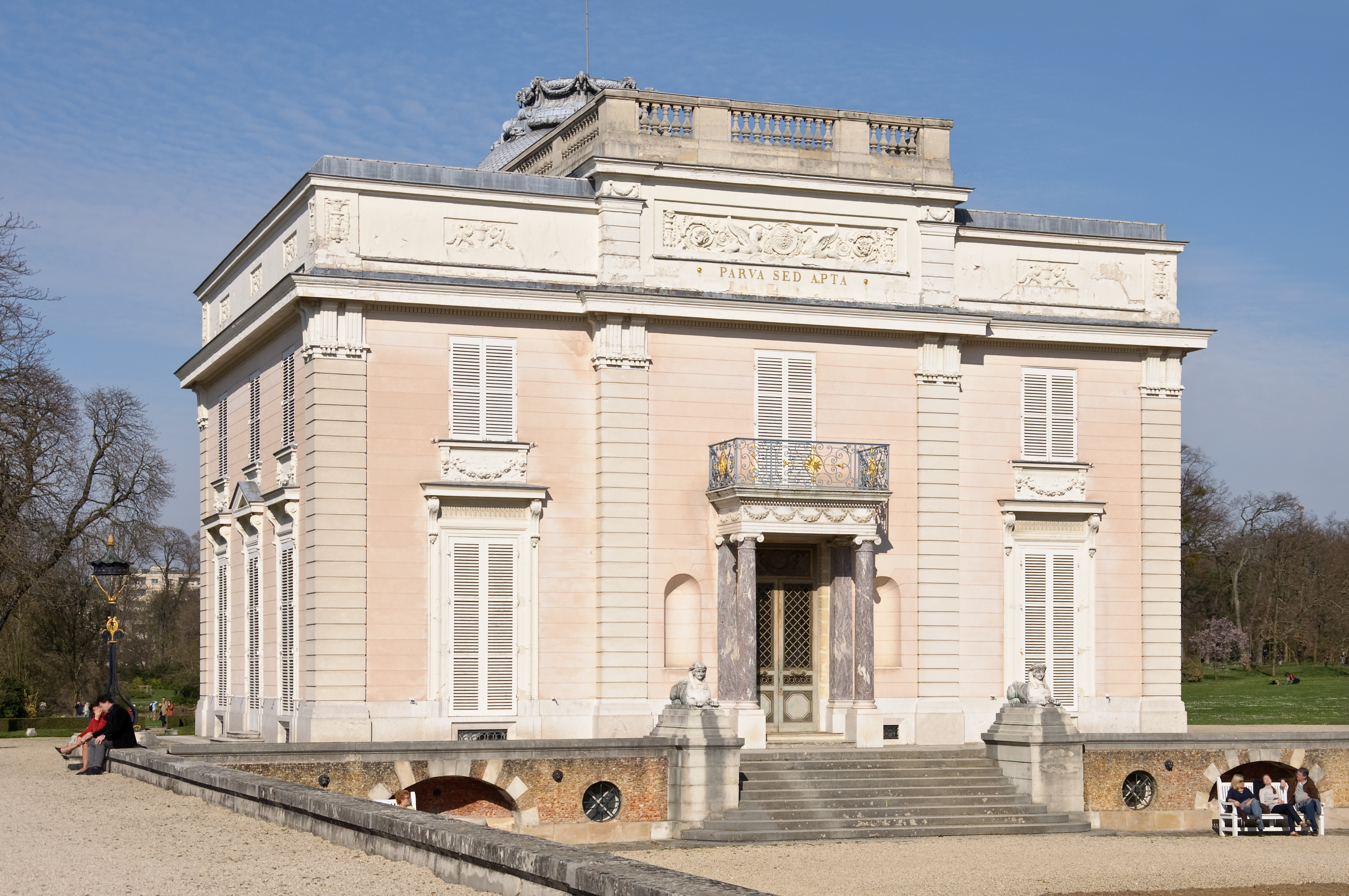
View of the entrance façade.

The château is a maison de plaisance intended for brief stays while hunting in the Bois de Boulogne in a party atmosphere. The French word bagatelle, from the Italian word bagatella, means a trifle or little decorative nothing. Initially, a small hunting lodge was built on the site for the Maréchal d'Estrées in 1720.

In 1775, the Comte d'Artois, Louis XVI's brother, purchased the property from the Prince de Chimay. The Comte soon had the existing house torn down, with plans to rebuild. Marie Antoinette wagered against the Comte, her brother-in-law, that the new château could not be completed within three months. The Comte engaged the Neoclassical architect François-Joseph Bélanger to design the building that remains in the park today.

The Comte won his bet by completing the house (the only residence ever designed and built expressly for him) in sixty-three days, from September 1777. It is estimated that the project, which came to include manicured gardens, employed eight hundred workers and cost over three million livres. Bélanger's brother-in-law, Jean-Démosthène Dugourc, provided much of the decorative detail.

The central domed feature was a music room. The master bedroom was fitted up in the manner of a military tent, and Hubert Robert executed a set of six Italianate landscapes for the bathroom. Most of the furnishings were provided by numerous Parisian marchand-merciers, notably Dominique Daguerre, and a decorative painter was A.-L. Delabrière.

== Motto ==
On the entablature of the entrance facade are inscribed the Latin words Parva sed Apta ("Small but suitable"), copied from the inscription the Italian poet Ariosto (d. 1533) had inscribed on his modest house at Ferrara. The full inscription read:

Parva sed apta mihi,
Sed nulli obnoxia, sed non Sordida,
Parta meo sed tamen aere domus.

== History ==
Map of the gardens surrounding the château in the Parc de Bagatelle

The location of Parc de Bagatelle was once the site of a lodge used by royal hunting parties which was purchased by the Marechal d’Estrées in the 18th century. A small chateau was built in 1720. In 1775, it was purchased by the brother of Louis XVI, the Count of Artois.

In 1777, a party was thrown in the recently completed house in honour of King Louis XVI and Queen Marie Antoinette. The party featured a new table game featuring a small billiard-like table with raised edges and cue sticks, which players used to shoot ivory balls up an inclined playfield with fixed pins. The table game was dubbed "bagatelle" by the Count and shortly after swept through France, evolving into various forms which eventually culminated in the modern pinball machine.

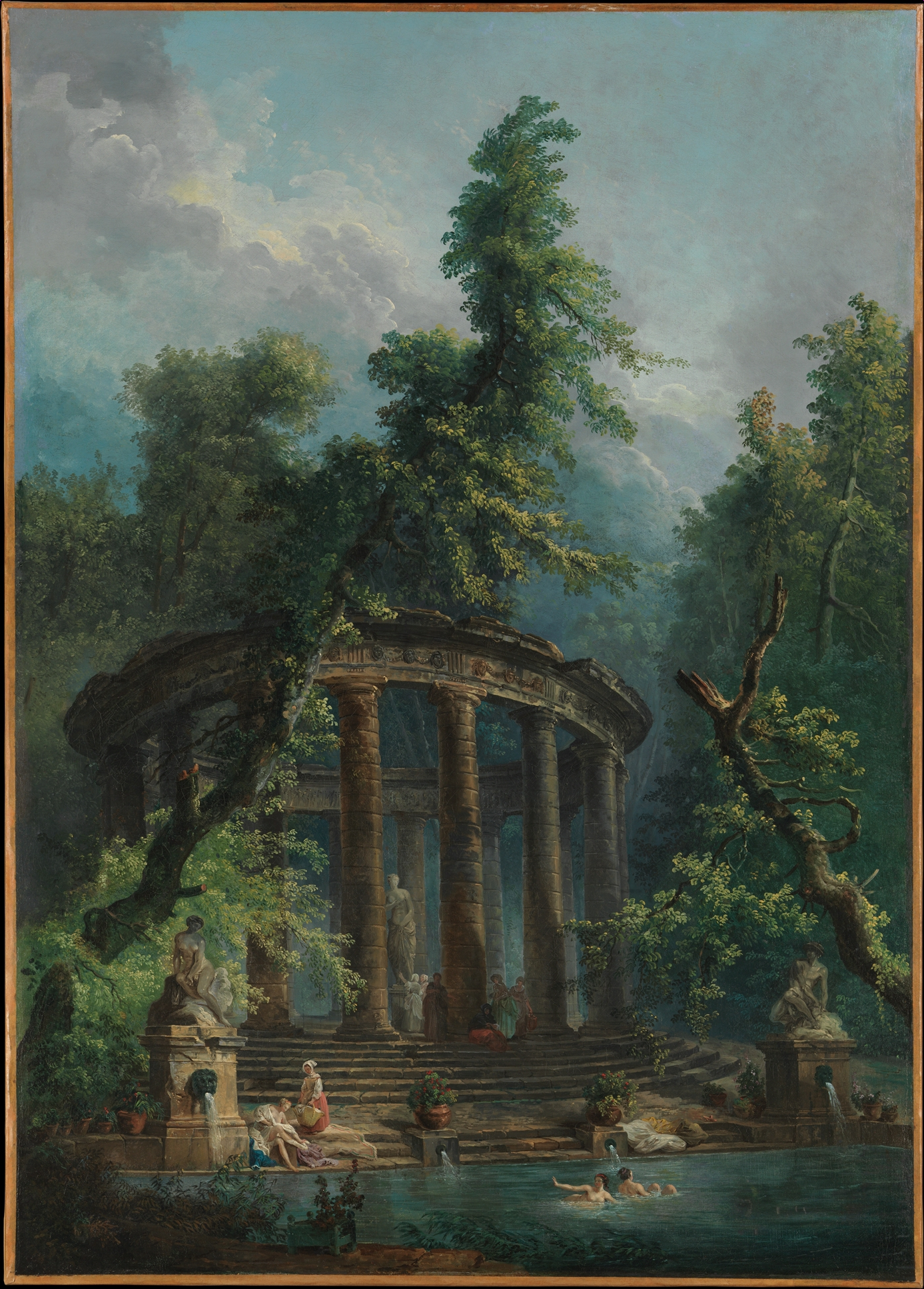
The Bathing Pool by Hubert Robert was at the Château de Bagatelle until 1808.

The formal garden spaces surrounding the château, which was linked to its dependencies by tunnels, was expanded with a surrounding park in the naturalistic English landscape style by the Scottish garden-designer Thomas Blaikie, and dotted with sham ruins, an obelisk, a pagoda, primitive hermits' huts and grottoes.

A fête given on 20 May 1780, described in Blaikie's diary, gives a sense of the extravagant atmosphere. An additional part of the Bois de Boulogne had recently been taken into the prince's grounds, but the wall remained:

Mr Belanger had an invention which made a Singulare effect by undermining the wall on the outside and placing people with ropes to pull the wall down at a word.... there was an actor who acted the part of a Magician who asked their Majesties how they liked the Gardens and what a beautiful view there was towards the plain if that wall did not obstruct it but that their Majesties need only give the word that he with his enchanted wand would make that wall disappear; the Queen not knowing told him with a laugh 'Very well I should wish to see it disappear' and in the instant the signal was given and above 200 yards opposite where the company stood fell flat to the ground which surprised them all"

Following the French Revolution, Napoleon I installed his son Napoleon II there, before the château was restored to the Bourbons. In 1835, it was sold by Henry, Count of Chambord to Francis Seymour-Conway, 3rd Marquess of Hertford and was inherited on his death seven years later by his son, the 4th Marquess, who already lived in Paris for most of the year. It contained the largest part of his extensive collection of French paintings, sculptures, furniture and works of decorative art, most of which went to form the Wallace Collection in London. Bagatelle underwent five years of redecorating and extensions, and then Lord Hertford did not reside in it until 1848.

Like most of his unentailed property, Bagatelle was left to his illegitimate son Sir Richard Wallace on Lord Hertford's death in 1870, as his entailed property and his title passed to a distant cousin. Bagatelle was acquired from his heir, Sir John Murray-Scott, by the City of Paris in 1905.

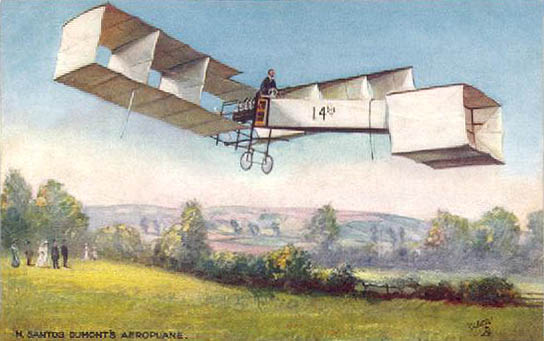
The Santos-Dumont 14-bis on an old postcard, flying at the château's grounds.

The Bagatelle gardens, created by Jean-Claude Nicolas Forestier, the Commissioner of Gardens for the city of Paris, are the site of the annual Concours international de roses nouvelles de Bagatelle, an international competition for new roses run by the City of Paris in June of each year. It was first organized in 1907, making it the oldest competition in the world dedicated to this flower.

Though the Revolutionary sales emptied the house, at Bagatelle in Sir John Murray-Scott's time were replicas of the bronze vases at Versailles. Upon the sale of the house by Sir John Murray-Scott, the vases were sent to his brother's house, Nether Swell Manor in Gloucestershire.

In 1892, the Bagatelle grounds hosted the first French championship match in rugby union, in which local side Racing Club de France, predecessor of today's Racing 92, defeated fellow Parisians Stade Français 4–3. The Bagatelle also played host to some of the polo events for the 1924 Summer Olympics in neighbouring Paris.

A number of the aviation experiments conducted by pioneer aviator Alberto Santos-Dumont used the grounds of Bagatelle, next to the château, as a flying field. This included the initial flights of his 1906-era Santos-Dumont 14-bis canard biplane.

== See also ==
- History of parks and gardens of Paris
