= The Bathing Pool =

Hubert Robert painting

- Le Bassin aux baigneuses (French)
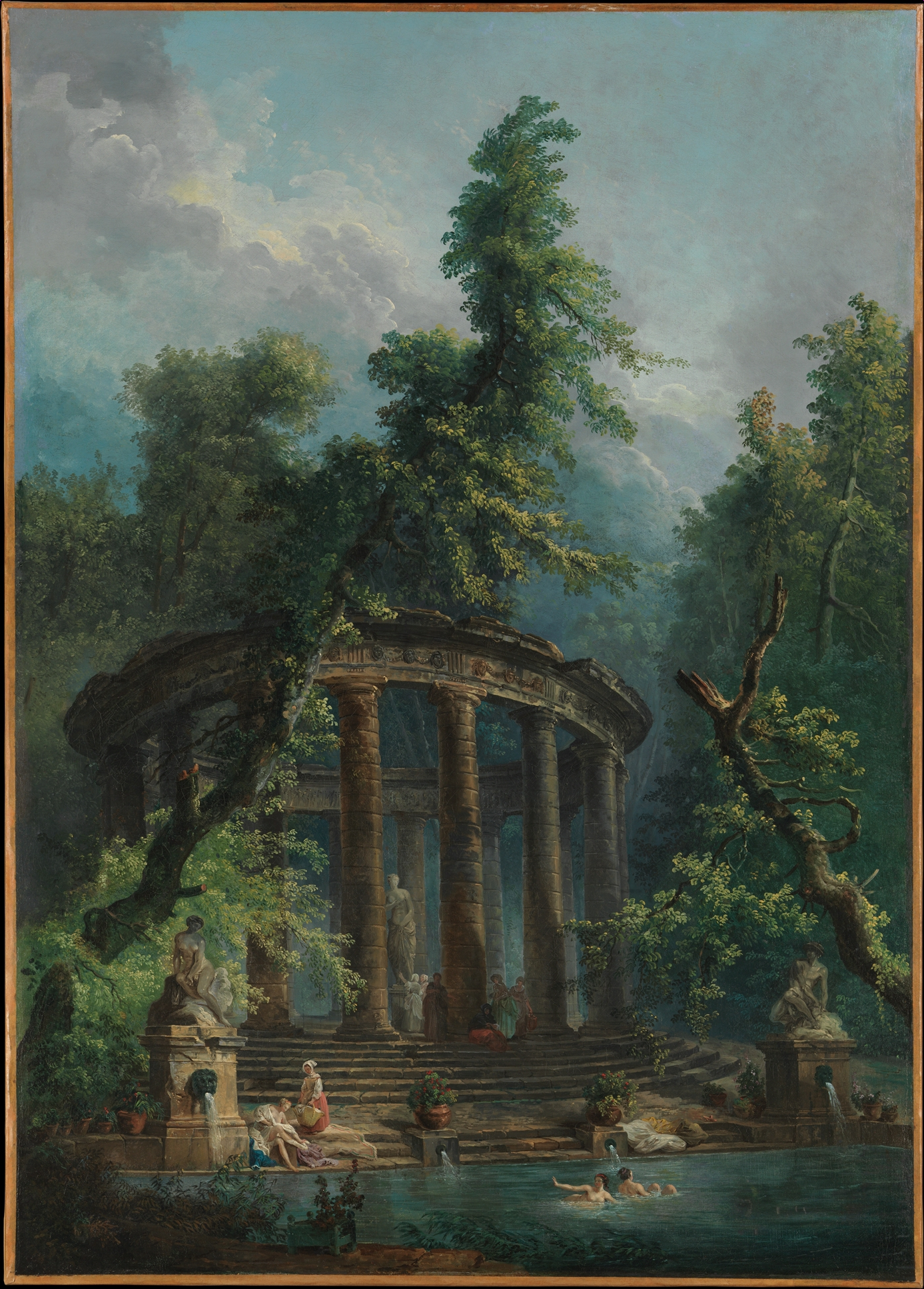
- Artist: Hubert Robert
- Year: 1777–1780
- Medium: Oil on canvas
- Dimensions: 174.6 cm × 123.8 cm (68 3/4 in × 48 3/4 in)
- Location: Metropolitan Museum of Art, New York

The Bathing Pool (French: Le Bassin de baignade) is an oil on canvas painting executed between 1777 and 1780 by the French painter Hubert Robert. Originally commissioned for the bathing room at the Château de Bagatelle, it is now in the collection of the Metropolitan Museum of Art, in New York.

== Background ==
The Bathing Pool is one of six paintings that Charles Philippe, comte d'Artois (1757–1836) commissioned from Robert in 1777. The paintings were for the bathing room at the Château de Bagatelle. The six paintings depict generally Italian locations. The Bathing Pool, dated to 1777–1780, was made as a pendant to A Corner of the Courtyard of the Capitol.

== Subject and composition ==
The scene depicts an open woodland temple with an ancient Venus statue at its centre. The ruined building is flanked by trees and has a set of stairs leading to a pool, where water flows from four fountains. The fountains furthest to the sides are decorated with statues: to the left one of a sitting Venus, and to the right one of Mercury fastening his sandals. A blurry group of six women in 18th-century clothes stand at the top of the stairs. To the bottom left, next to the Venus statue, a sitting woman dries her feet in front of a maid. In the pool two nude women play in the shallow water.

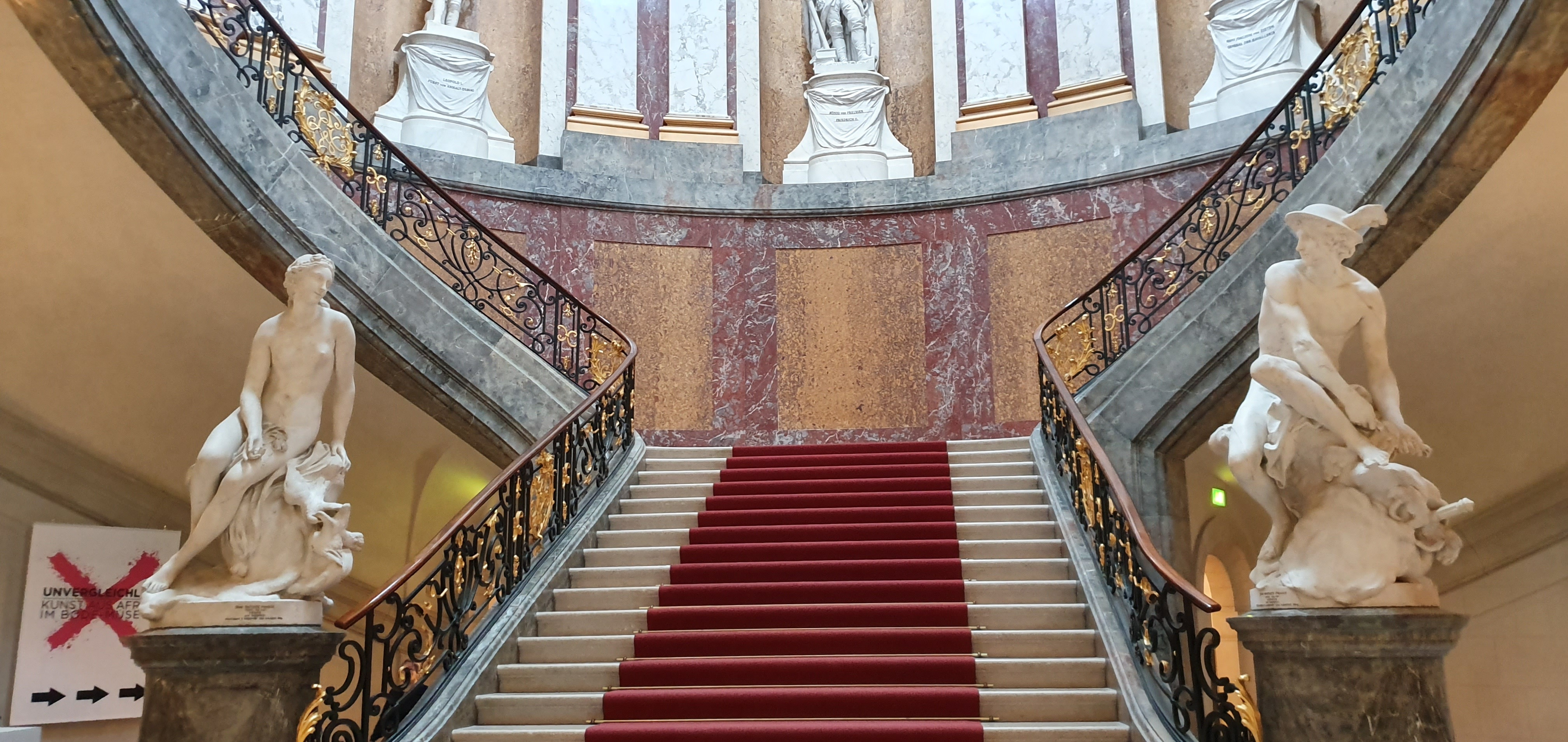
The statues of Venus and Mercury are based on sculptures by Jean-Baptiste Pigalle.

The appearance of the temple is likely inspired by the Temple of Vesta in Tivoli, the Macellum of Pozzuoli (then thought to be a temple of Jupiter Serapis), and possibly Donato Bramante's Tempietto at San Pietro in Montorio. The central statue is based on an ancient model, and those on the sides are based on sculptures by Jean-Baptiste Pigalle (1714–1785). The woman drying herself follows a painting by François Boucher (1703–1770). The nudes were inspired by Claude Joseph Vernet (1714–1789), who had populated timeless Italian marine views with nude women.

The style is mainly rococo.

== Analysis ==
The painting depicts an imaginary location with contemporary visitors. It has decidedly modern elements, such as 18th-century French cloaks and hoods, a woman pointing at a statue like a tourist, and a pair of modern pink shoes belonging to a bather. The contemporary allusions make the nudity atypical; 18th-century paintings normally restricted nudity to mythological and allegorical subjects.

In his 2006 book Logics of Worlds, the post-Marxist philosopher Alain Badiou analysed the painting as an example of how "pictoral assemblage" fundamentally is about "distributing identities and differences". He saw the composition of temple, women, statues and water as "a subtle transcendental network of identities", exalted by "figurative differences", which place the painting in the genre of neoclassicism. Badiou concluded that "the world" of the painting is the juncture between eighteenth-century eroticism and pre-romanticism. Finally, he used the correspondences between the statues and groups of women, and the foliage to the left and the clearing to the bottom left, to argue that existence merely is a category of appearing.

== Provenance ==
The six paintings remained at the Château de Bagatelle until 1808, when Napoleon's Administration des Domaines sold them at auction to Jacques-Nicolas Brunot. Brunot sold them to Pierre Justin Armand Verdier, comte de Flaux. They were at the Château de Flaux until 1910–1911, when J. P. Morgan bought them through Maurice de Verneuil. They were on loan from Morgan to the Metropolitan Museum of Art from May 1912 and gifted to the museum by Morgan's estate in 1917. They were part of the exhibition Œuvres d'Hubert Robert at Galerie Thos in Paris from 12 to 30 March 1912, lent by Morgan.

== See also ==
- The Mouth of a Cave, another painting in the set
