= Bourse de commerce (Paris) =

Commodity market

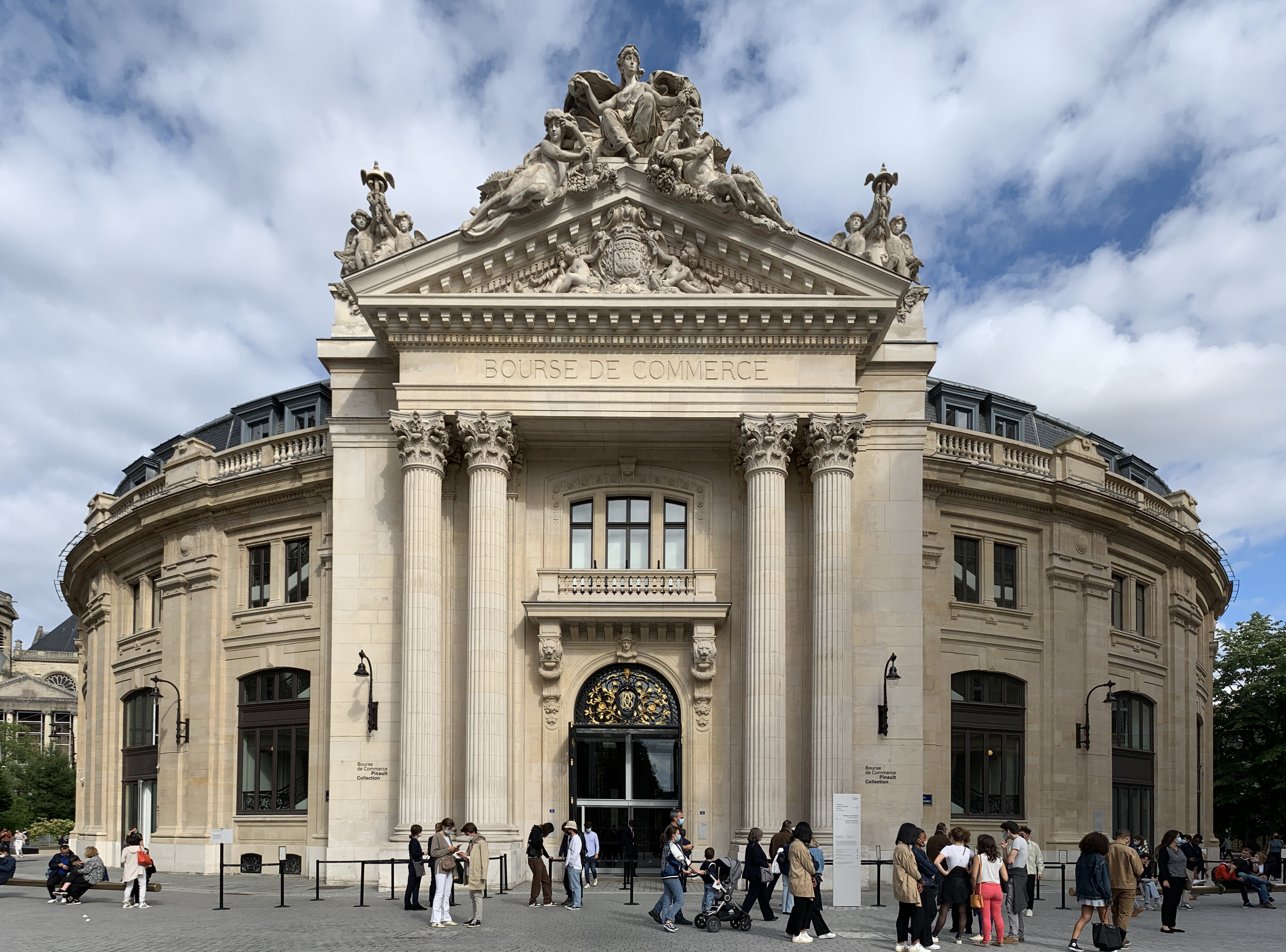
- Bourse de commerce

- Location within Paris

General information
- Type: Hall
- Classification: Historical monument
- Location: 2, rue de Viarmes, Paris (1st arrondissement), France
- Coordinates: 48.862731°N 2.342780°E

Design and construction
- Architects: François-Joseph Bélanger, Henri Blondel
- Engineer: François Brunet

Website
- web.archive.org/web/20150709073916/http://www.sgbcp.fr:80/en/Home

The Bourse de commerce (Commodities Exchange) is a building in Paris, originally used as a place to negotiate the trade of grain and other commodities, and later to provide services to businesses by the Paris Chamber of Commerce during the latter part of the 20th century. It has its origins in a circular wheat exchange built in 1763–67, with an open-air interior court that was later capped by a wooden dome replaced in 1811 with a copper one (supported by an iron skeletal structure). In a major reconstruction in 1888–89 much of the structure was replaced, although the layout remained the same and the dome was retained albeit adding glass and a mounted canvas.

Since 2021, the building has been the Parisian exhibition site of the Pinault Collection. The dome of the building is listed as a historical monument.

== History ==
=== Early buildings ===
Between 1574 and 1584 Jean Bullant (1515–78) built a hôtel particulier (grand house) on the site for Catherine de' Medici (1519–89). A tower with an encaged observation platform, now called the Medici column, was built beside the hôtel from which observations of the stars could be made for astrological purposes. The Queen's hôtel was bought by Charles de Bourbon-Condé, Count of Soissons, who repaired and enlarged it. The hotel became called the Hôtel de Soissons. The indebted last owner was Victor Amadeus of Savoy (1690–1741). After his death the hotel was demolished in 1748 and the materials sold to pay the creditors. The city of Paris bought the column from its first owner, Laurent Destouches, which saved it from destruction.

Between 1763 and 1767 the City of Paris built a circular building on the site for the storage and sale of wheat. The Halle aux blés (Wheat Exchange) was designed by Nicolas Le Camus de Mézières with a circular central courtyard and a double staircase. The layout of that building has been retained. From 1782 to 1783 a wooden dome was built to a design by Jacques-Guillaume Legrand and Jacques Molinos based on the principles defined by Philibert de l'Orme. On 16 October 1802 the cupola was destroyed by fire. A new design by François-Joseph Bélanger for an iron dome covered in sheets of copper was selected after some controversy. Victor Hugo described the dome in his 1831 novel Notre-Dame de Paris as an English jockey-cap on a large scale. The wheat exchange was closed in 1873. In 1885 the building was assigned to the Commodities Exchange. Until then the exchange had been housed in the Palais Brongniart.

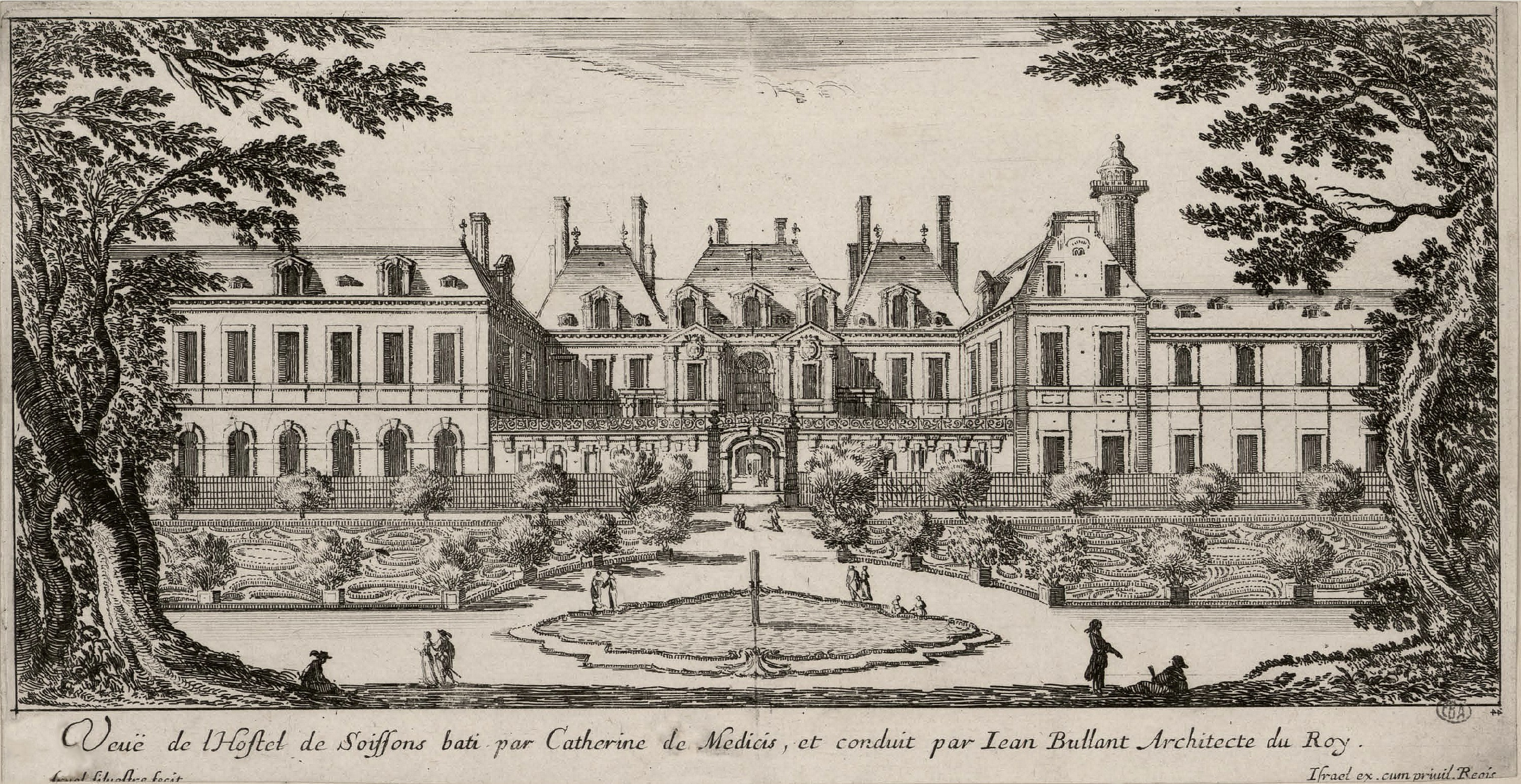
Hôtel de Soissons

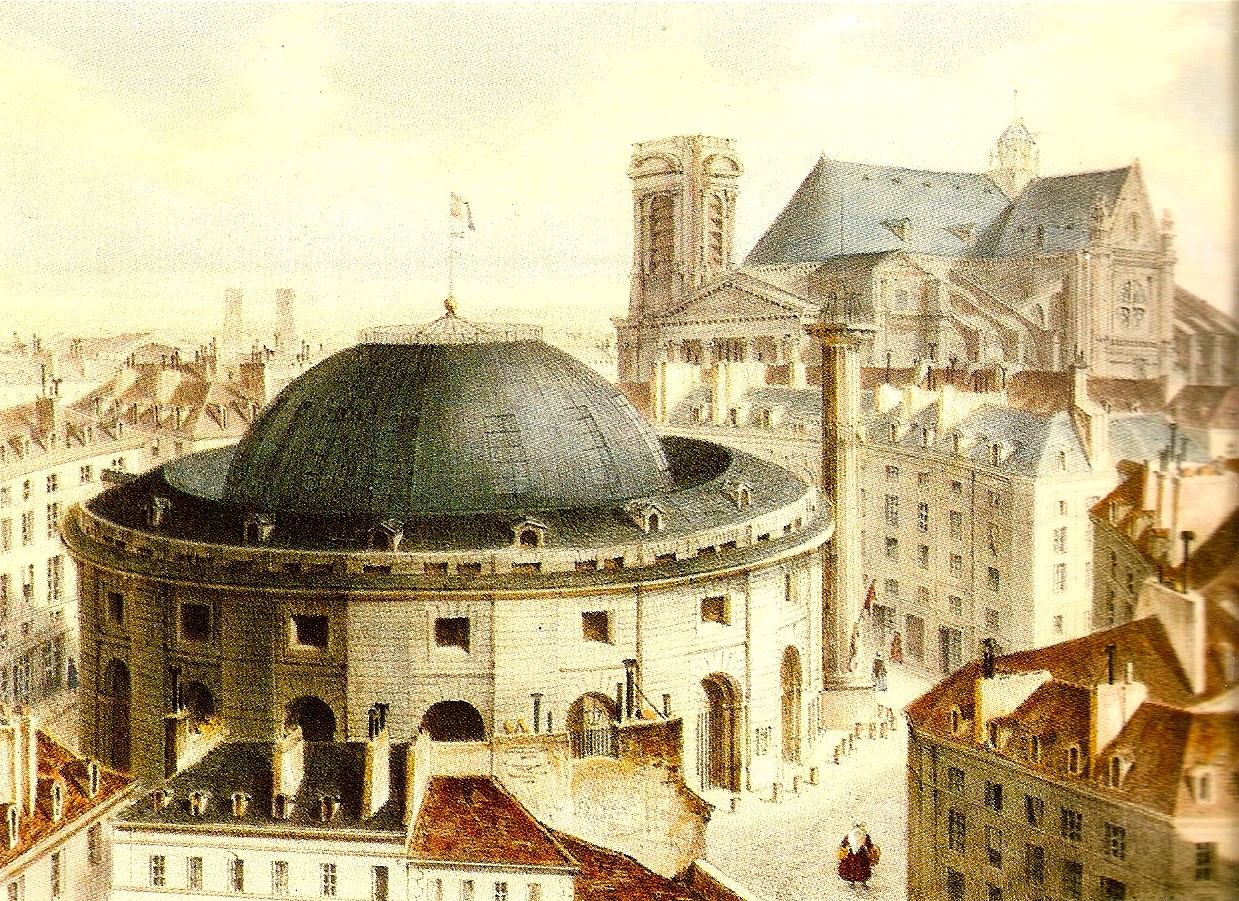
Wheat exchange in 1838

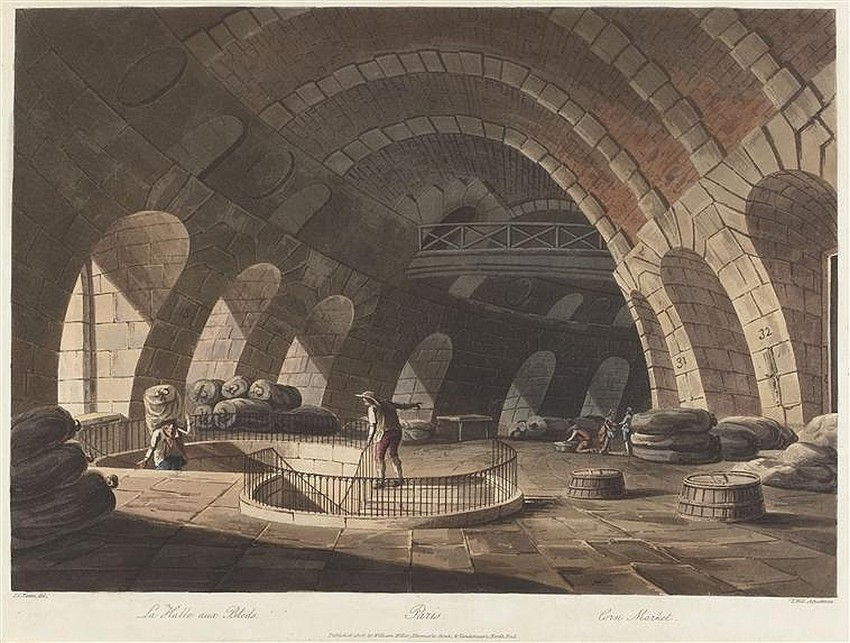
Vaulted attic of the wheat exchange

=== 1886 renovation ===
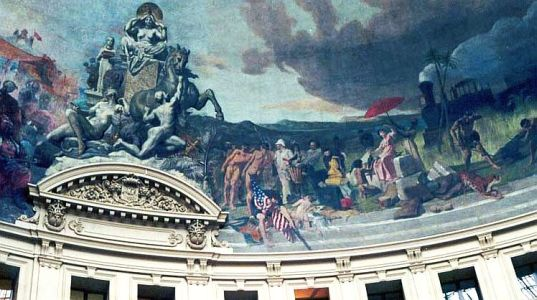
The United States by Évariste Vital Luminais

In 1885 Henri Blondel began a major renovation of the building. Construction took place between 1888 and 1889. It incorporated elements from the Hôtel de Soissons, from the Halle aux blés of Nicolas Le Camus de Mézières and from the second cupola covering that hall by Belanger. The building designed by Blondel still had a circular shape, with 25 bays separated by two pilasters. Blondel retained but modified the cupola. The 18th century double staircase was also retained.

The entrance portico is surmounted by a pediment supported by four fluted Corinthian columns on which three allegorical figures by the sculptor Aristide Croisy represent the City of Paris flanked by Trade and Abundance. The interior of the rotunda was decorated by the painters Alexis-Joseph Mazerolle, Évariste Vital Luminais, Désiré François Laugée, Georges Clairin and Hippolyte Lucas. Painted panels depict characters that symbolize North, East, South, and West, and frescoes represent the history of trade between the five continents.

=== Recent years ===
The City of Paris sold the building to the Paris Chamber of Commerce for one symbolic franc in 1949. The murals and cupola were classified as a historical monument on 15 January 1975. A major renovation was undertaken in 1989. The murals were restored in 1998. The building may be reached by metro from the stations Louvre – Rivoli and Les Halles, and by Réseau Express Régional from the Châtelet les Halles station.

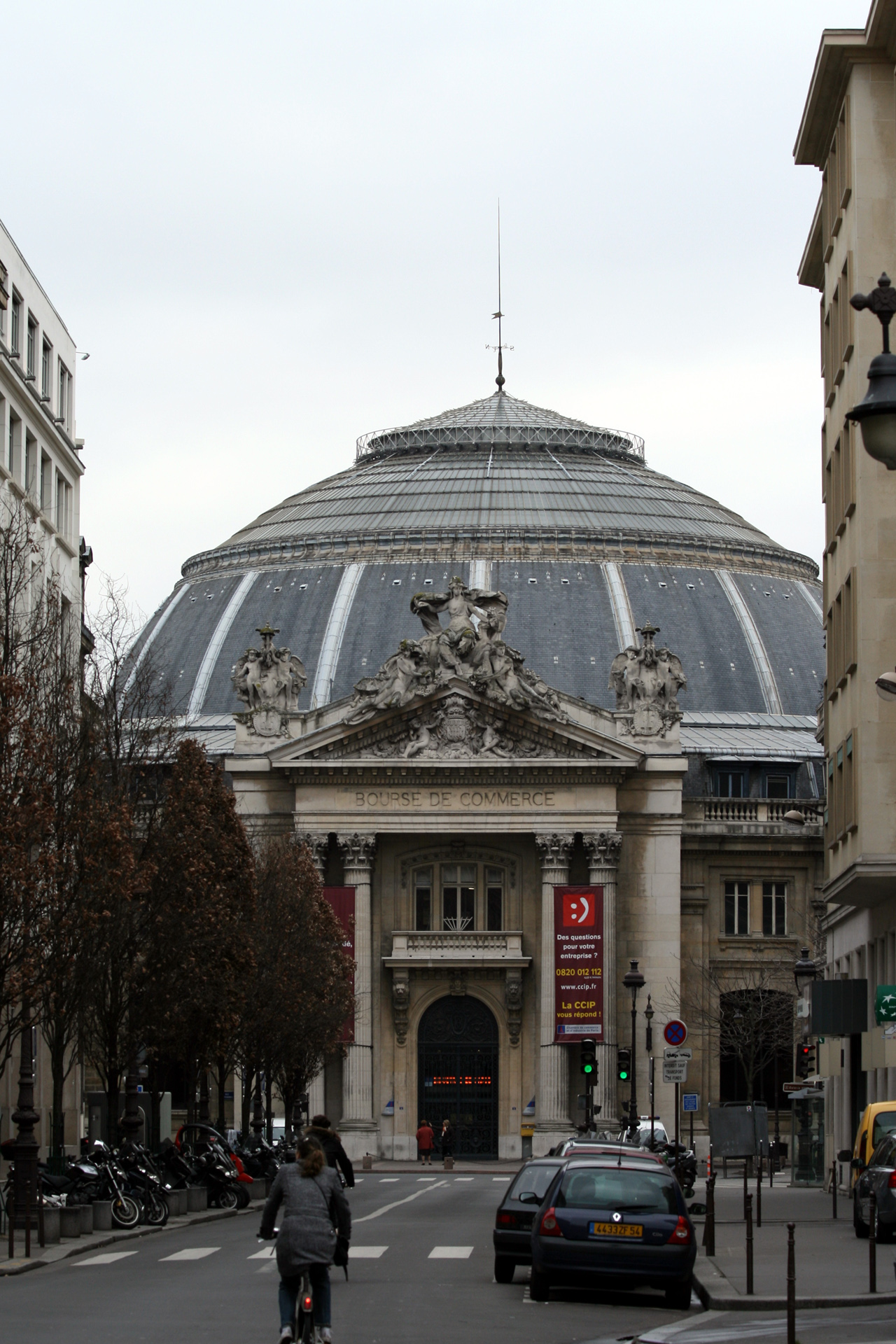
Entrance of the Bourse de Commerce

== Use as a stock exchange ==
The Syndicat Général de la Bourse de commerce de Paris (General Union of the Paris Commodities Exchange) was created in 1854. Many futures markets functioned at the Commodities Exchange from its inception, at first under the control of syndicates for wheat, rye and oats, flour, oil, sugar, alcohol, and rubber. The collapse of wheat prices in 1929 led to the reform of 1935 that created the Compagnie des Commissionnaires, confirmed by law in 1950. After the World War II (1939–45) the futures markets were opened gradually to international trading in goods such as white sugar, cocoa, coffee, potato, soybean meal, and rapeseed. These were traded in auction lots. The negotiations were managed and controlled successively by the Compagnie des Commissionnaires Agréés, the Banque Centrale de Compensation, and then the MATIF (Marché à Terme International de France).

With the computerization of futures markets, in 1998 market activity ended at the Bourse de Commerce building. The exchange continues as an electronic market within Euronext. On 1 January 2013 the Chambre de commerce et d'industrie départementale de Paris was created as a division of the CCI de région Paris Ile-de-France. It has its headquarters at 2 Place de la Bourse and operational services at the Bourse de commerce. As of 2015 there were 36 elected officials and a staff of 125 people. The CCI Paris acts as an advocate for business in Paris, and provides support to company creators, marketers and business leaders.

The Syndicat Général continues to facilitate dialog and interactions between companies involved in aspects of the cereals and oil seeds trade, including collection, transportation, storage, crop protection, and finance. In 2015 the Syndicat Général changed its name to Agro Paris Bourse. It is part of the Consortium of European Exchanges, headquartered in Strasbourg.

== Pinault Collection ==
In 2016, the mayor of Paris, Anne Hidalgo, offered François Pinault a 50-year lease on the Bourse de Commerce for a lump sum of €15 million, plus yearly fees. Shortly after, the Paris City Council approved the project to transform the building into an exhibition space for contemporary art, including pieces from Pinault's private collection of more than 3,500 works valued at around €1.25 billion. In 2017, Pinault publicly presented plans by architect Tadao Ando for placing a 30-foot-high concrete cylinder inside the building to be the Bourse's main exhibition gallery, at construction costs of $170 million. Spanning more than 113,000 sq ft (10,500 m^{2}), it is expected to be the biggest of the three museums operated by Pinault. It will have 32,000 sq ft (3,000 m^{2}) of exhibition space and an underground auditorium.

The Bourse's initial opening date had been set for summer 2020, before it was delayed due to the COVID-19 pandemic in France. Instead, it opened in mid-May 2021. The final cost of the renovation was $195 million. The inaugural exhibition was called "Ouverture," referring to the introductory piece that is played at the beginning of an opera. The exhibit presented the works of several international artists including Urs Fischer, Kerry James Marshall, Marlene Dumas, Luc Tuymans, and Cindy Sherman.

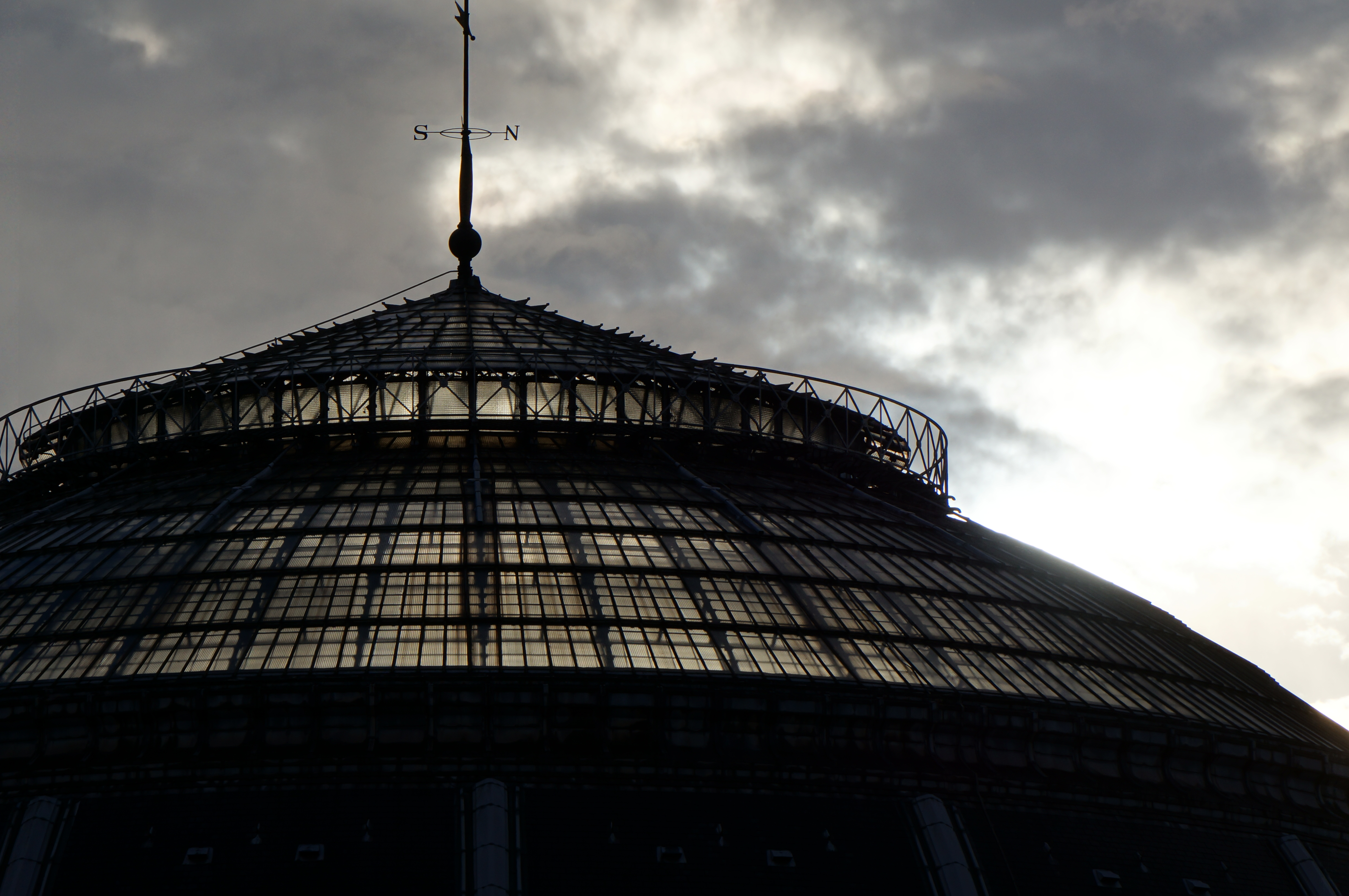
Detail of the cupola.

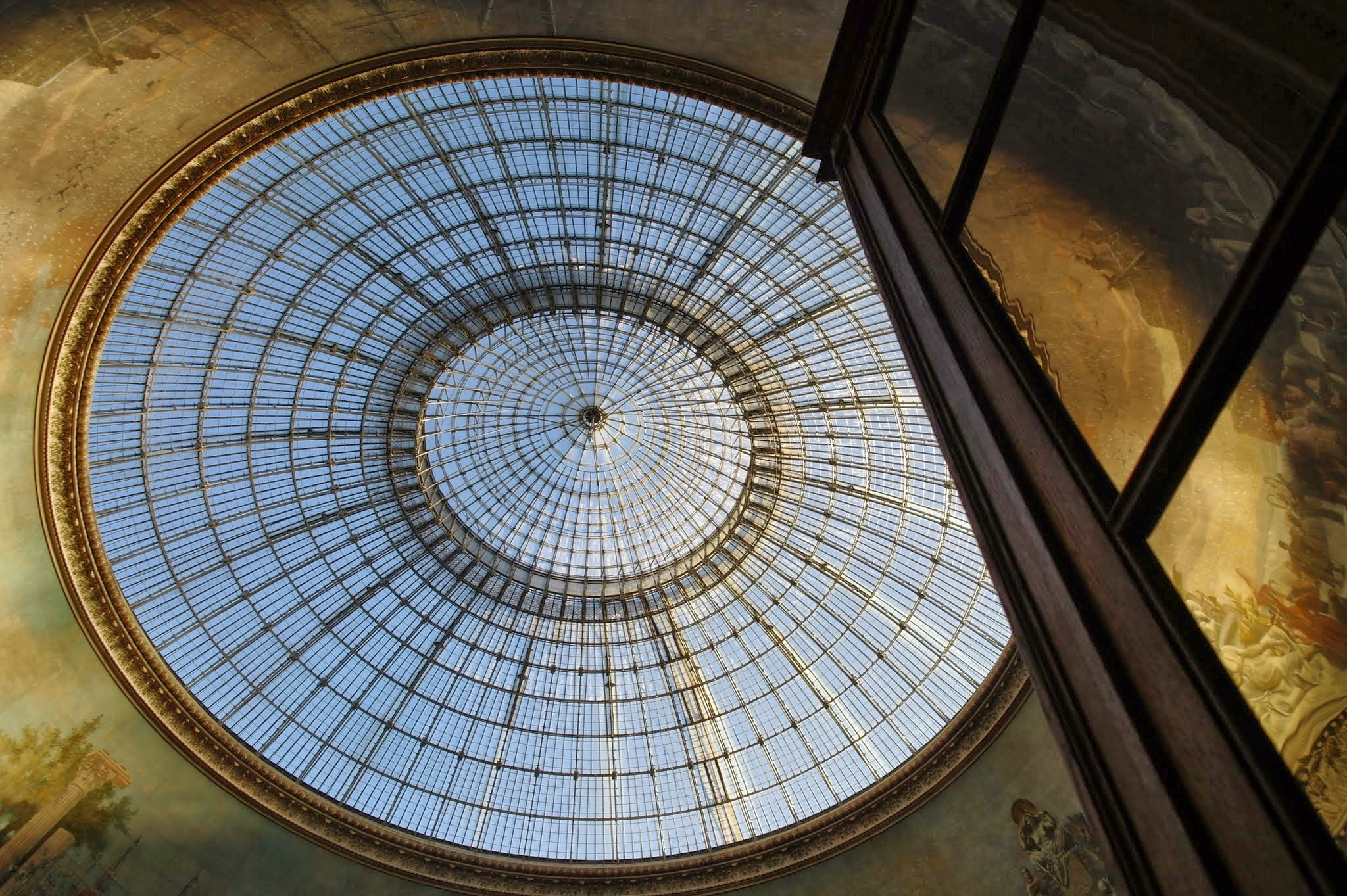
Interior of the cupola.

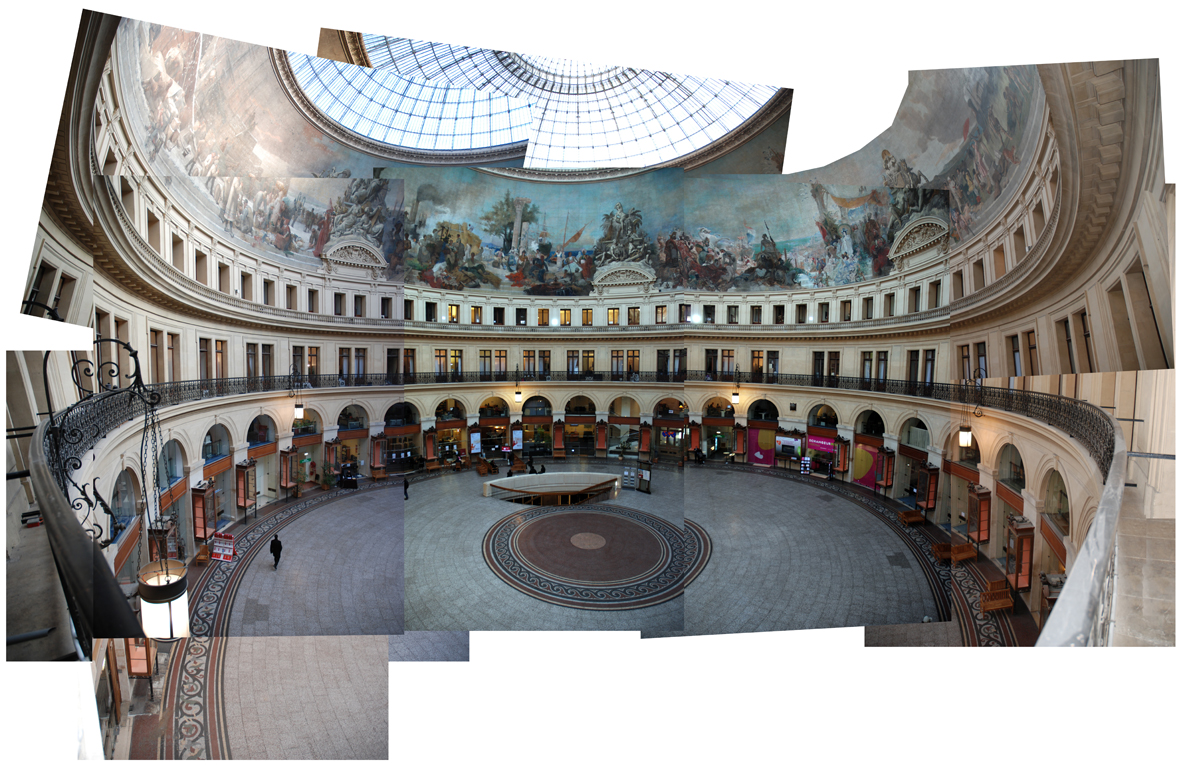
Interior (before 2020).

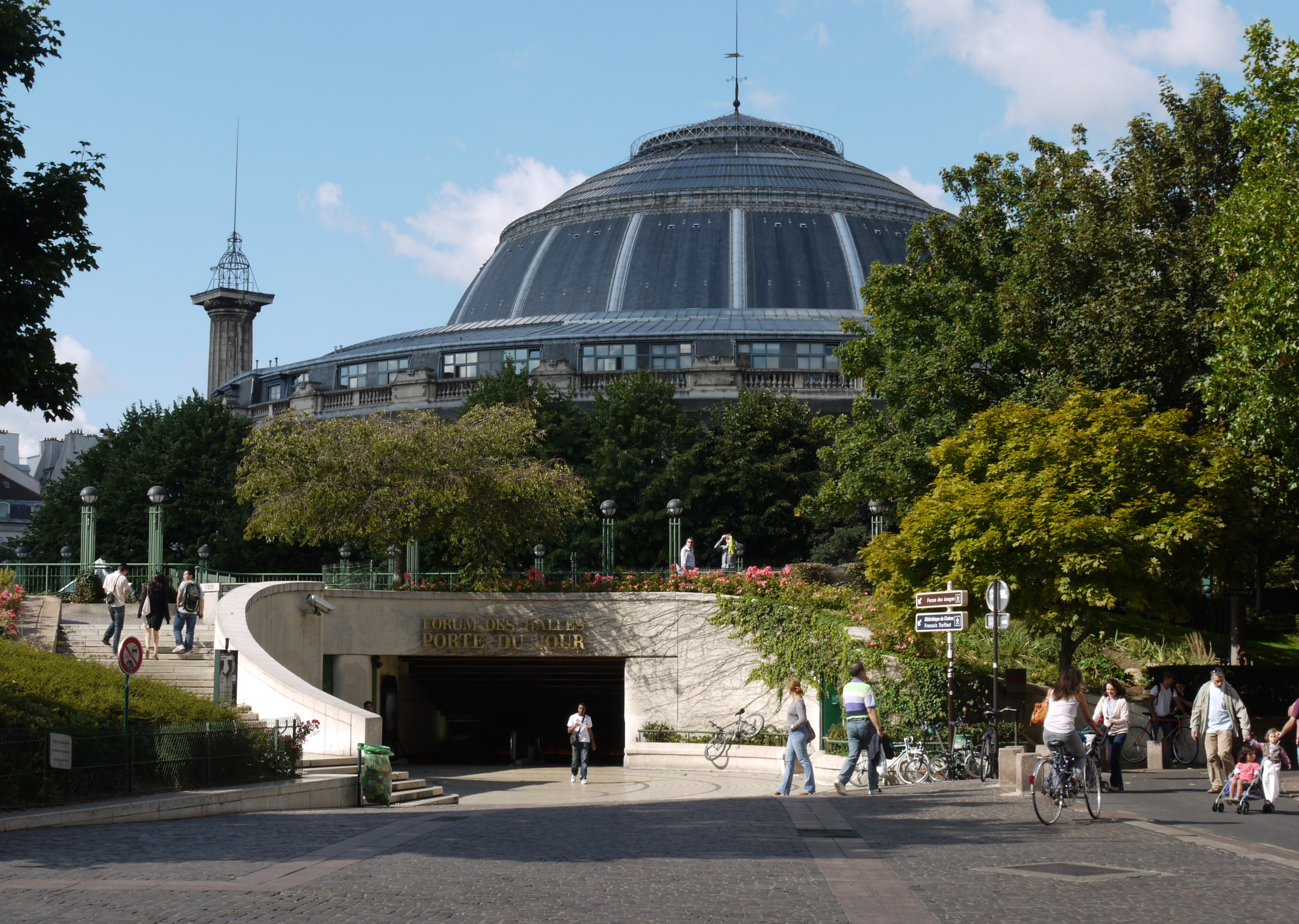
Forum des Halles and Bourse de Commerce.

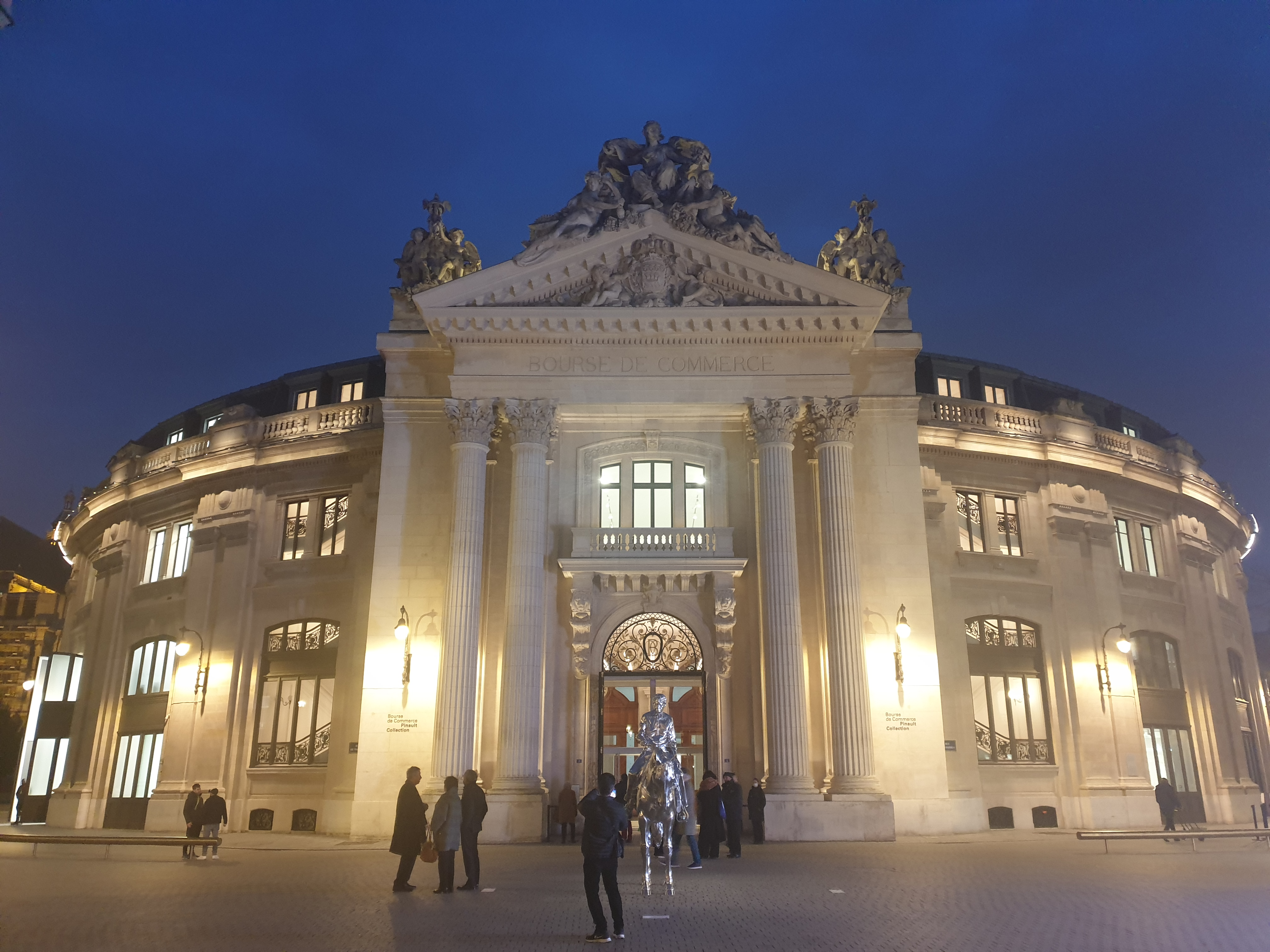
Bourse de commerce by night in 2022.

== Sources ==
- "Bourse de Commerce" (PDF) (in French). CCI Paris Ile-de-France.
- "Bourse de Commerce". Lonely Planet.
- "Bourse de commerce". Mérimée (in French). Ministère de la Culture (France).
- "Bourse de Commerce - Paris 1e". 1900larnouveau (in French).
- "Bourse de Commerce". Structurae (in French).
- "Bourse de Commerce". Time Out.
- Colling, Alfred (1949). La Prodigieuse Histoire de la Bourse. Paris: Société d'éditions économiques et financières.
- Hillairet, Jacques (1978). "Connaissance du Vieux Paris" (in French). Editions de Minuit.
- "La CCI Paris". CCI Paris Ile-de-France.
- "Poussez les portes de l'hôtel Potocki et de la Bourse de commerce" (in French). CCI Paris Ile-de-France.
- "Présentation" (in French). Agro Paris Bourse. Archived from the original on 2015-05-05.
