= The Mouth of a Cave =

Painting by Hubert Robert

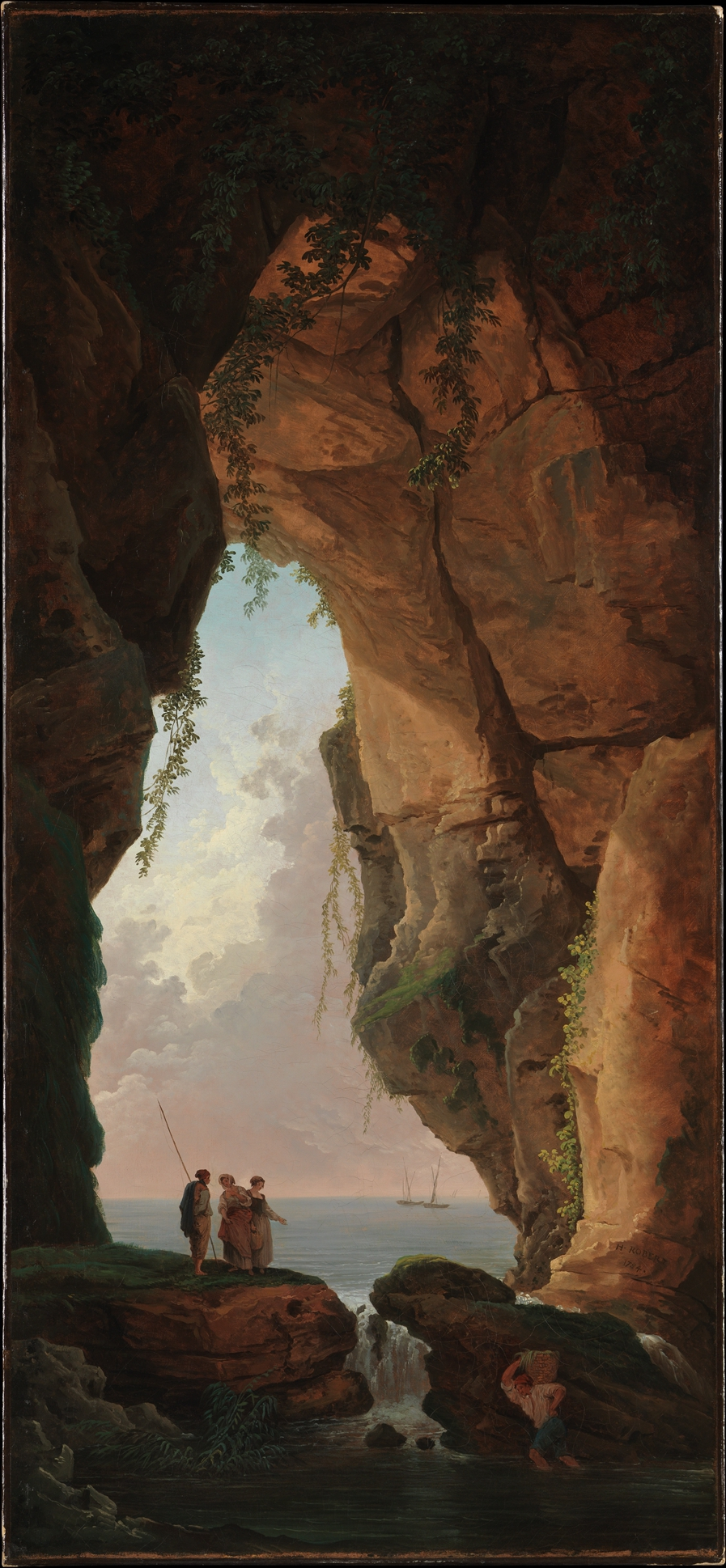
- Artist: Hubert Robert
- Year: 1784
- Medium: Oil on canvas
- Subject: Clotilde García del Castillo
- Dimensions: 174.6 cm × 79.4 cm (68.7 in × 31.3 in)
- Location: Metropolitan Museum of Art; New York

The Mouth of a Cave is an oil-on-canvas painting by French artist Hubert Robert, created in 1784. The painting is in the collection of the Metropolitan Museum of Art, in New York.

== Description ==
The Mouth of a Cave was painted by Robert as part of a set of six paintings for the younger brother of Louis XVI. The work was at one point damaged by water, though it was later restored.

The subject is likely to be inspired by the Grotta del Tuono in the Gulf of Naples. The Posillipo tunnel has also been suggested as a possible source of inspiration.

== See also ==
- The Bathing Pool, one of the other paintings of the set
