= Jacques-Guillaume Legrand =

French architect and critic

- Born: 9 May 1753; Paris, France
- Died: 10 November 1807 (aged 54); Saint-Denis, France
- Occupation: Architect

Jacques-Guillaume Legrand (9 May 1753 – 10 November 1807) was a French architect and critic.

== Early years ==
Jacques-Guillaume Legrand was born on 9 May 1753 in Paris. He studied at the Louis-le-Grand College, then entered the National School of Bridges and Roads (École Nationale des Ponts et Chaussées, ENPC), where his ability caught the attention of Jean-Rodolphe Perronet, the founder of the school. While still at the ENPC he also took lessons from Jacques-François Blondel at the Royal Academy of Architecture (Académie royale d'architecture). It was here that he met Jacques Molinos, with whom he would often work in the future. Molinos was ten years older. Legrand learned neoclassical concepts from Blondel. After Blondel died he took lessons from Charles-Louis Clérisseau, whose daughter he married.

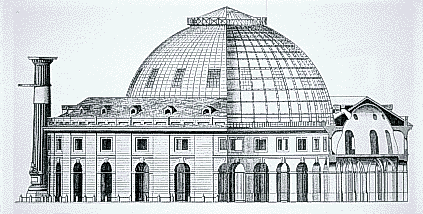
Halle aux blés

Legrand and Molinos visited Italy together, where Legrand examined the monuments using the book by Antoine Desgodetz as his guide. He made notes in this book, and corrected some errors. He planned to use the notes for a revised edition, but he unwisely entrusted them to another man who passed them off as his own. The two friends visited the temples of Paestum, and were going to visit Magna Graecia when they were recalled to France.

== Career ==
In 1783 Legrand and Molinos built a dome over the courtyard of the Corn Exchange (Halle aux blés, Paris), which Nicolas Le Camus de Mézières (1721–1789) had built in 1763 with a circular rotunda and open courtyard colonnade. The dome was of pine planks sheathed in copper and lead and topped by a lantern of iron. The design was based on the principles of Philibert de l'Orme. They used glazed panels to introduce light into the courtyard. The dome had a diameter of 150 feet (46 m), but did not require changes to the existing structure, and became a visitor attraction. Thomas Jefferson commented on the ingenious design.

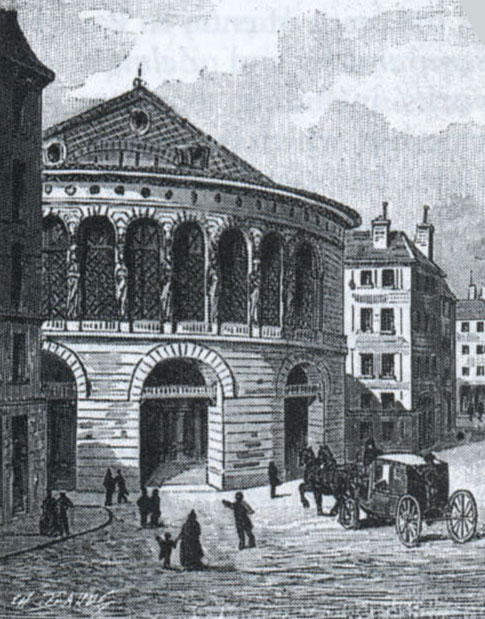
Théâtre Feydeau

Legrand undertook public and private commissions, and also wrote as an art critic. The Minister of the Interior gave Legrand the task of restoring the monuments of Paris. The prefect of the department assigned him to the committee charged with supervising buildings. Legrand and Molinos built the Cloth Hall in 1786, destroyed in 1855. The cloth market vault was supported on terracotta tubes, and the roof was covered with copper. In its day the cloth market roof was almost as well known as the dome of the corn market. Legrand and Molinos worked on developing the Paris markets, and also designed the Théâtre Feydeau in the rue de Richelieu.

Legrand was charged with restoring the Église de Saint-Denis and the sepulcher of the kings, and moved to the site to supervise the work. He became ill from overexertion, and died in Saint-Denis on 10 November 1808. He was buried in the cemetery of Auteuil.

== Publications ==
Legrand began work on a huge General History of Architecture, but it was not completed or published. He published:

- Legrand, Jacques-Guillaume; Clerisseau, C. (1804). Antiquités de la France par C. Clerisseau, architecte,... le texte historique et descriptif par J. G. Legrand,. imp. de P. Didot l'aîné.
- Jacques Guillaume Legrand (1804). Histoire abrégée de la ville de Nisme et de ses antiquités (in French). Paris.
- Jacques Guillaume Legrand (1806). Collection des chefs-d'œuvre de l'architecture des différens peuples, exécutés en modèles, sous la direction de L.-F. Cassas... décrite et analysée, par J.-G. Legrand (in French). Paris: impr. de Leblanc.
- Jacques Guillaume Legrand; Charles Paul Landon (1808). Description de Paris et de ses édifices (in French). Vol. 2. Paris: Treuttel et Würtz.
- Jacques Guillaume Legrand; Louis-Pierre Baltard (1827). A Series Of Lithographic Drawings Illustrative Of The Relation Between The Human Physiognomy And That Of The Brute Creation. Blanquet.
- Jacques Guillaume Legrand (1842). Essai sur l'histoire générale de l'architecture, pour servir de texte explicatif au Recueil et parallèle des édifices de tout genre, anciens et modernes, remarquables par leur beauté, par leur grandeur ou par leur singularité, par J. N. L. Durand (in French). Vol. 2. Paris: Meline, Cans et Cie, impr. de Gillé fils, an VIII-an IX.

== Sources ==
- Braham, Allan (1989). The Architecture of the French Enlightenment. University of California Press. p. 110. ISBN 978-0-520-06739-4.
- Landon, C. P. (1809). "Notice sur Legrand". Essai sur l'histoire générale de l'architecture: pour servir de texte explicatif au recueil et parallèle des édifices de tout genre, anciens et modernes, remarquables par leur beauté, leur grandeur ou leur singularité par J. G. Legrand (in French).
- Palmer, Allison Lee (2011-02-11). Historical Dictionary of Neoclassical Art and Architecture. Scarecrow Press. ISBN 978-0-8108-7474-9.
