= Halle aux blés (Paris) =

Former building in Paris, France

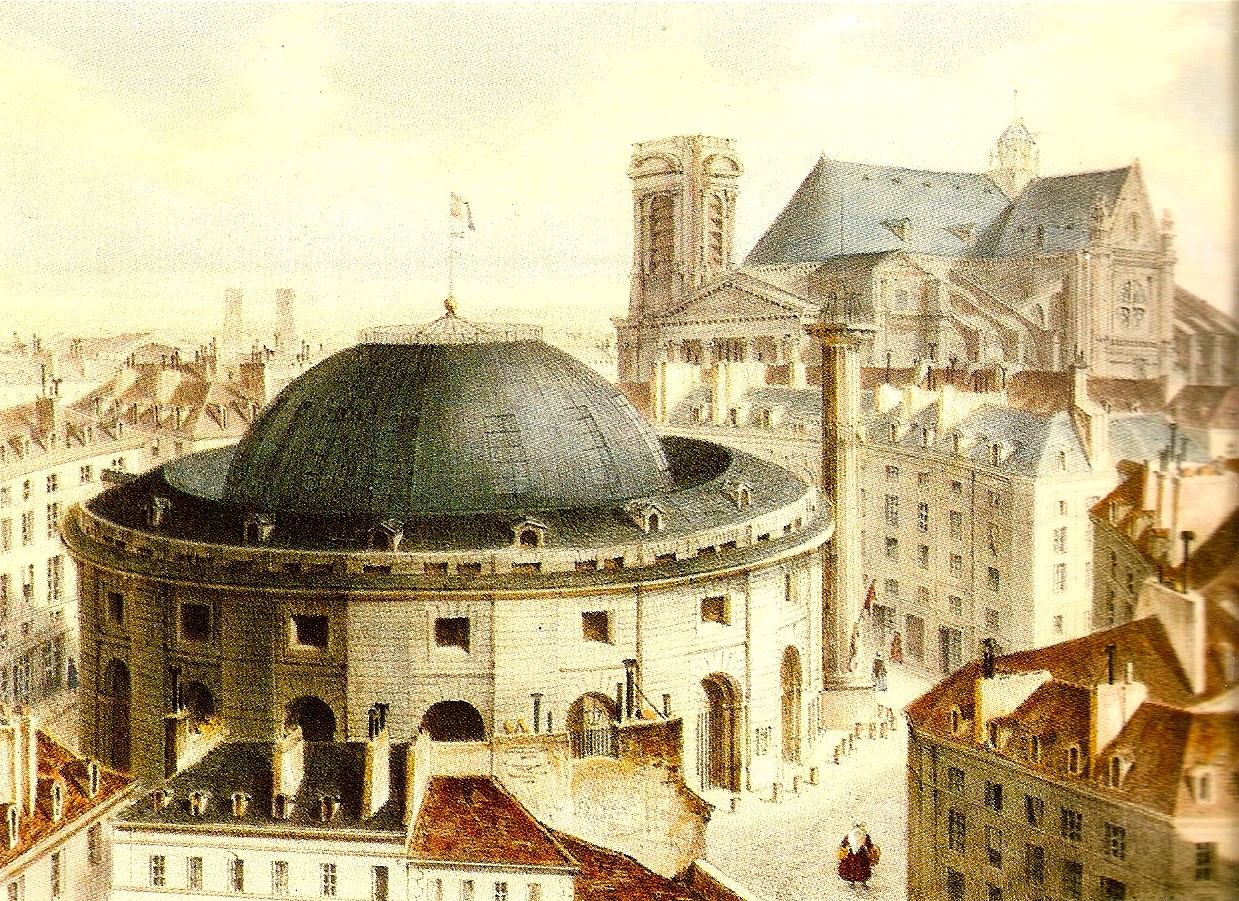
- Hall in 1838, Medici column to its right

- Location within Paris

General information
- Type: Wheats or Grains exchange
- Location: 2, rue de Viarmes, Paris (1st arrondissement), France
- Coordinates: 48.862731°N 2.342780°E
- Construction started: 1763
- Opened: 1767
- Closed: 1873
- Demolished: 1887

The Halle aux blés (Wheats Exchange or Grains Exchange) was a circular building in central Paris used by grain traders built in 1763–1767, with an open-air interior court that was capped by a wooden dome in 1783, then by an iron dome in 1811. In a major reconstruction in 1888–1889 much of the structure was replaced and the building became the Bourse de commerce.

The structure influenced the design of public buildings in Britain and the United States.

== History ==
The city of Paris purchased the site of the former Hôtel de Soissons in 1755. The hôtel had been demolished and its materials sold, but the Medici column was left standing. On 23 November 1762 King Louis XV (1710–1774) declared that a hall of grain and flour (halle aux blés et farines) would be built on the site. Construction of the hall began in 1763 following a design by Nicolas Le Camus de Mézières (1721–89), who supervised the work. The circular hall surrounding a circular courtyard was completed in 1767. Six roads radiated from the Rue Viarmes, which ran around the hall.

Work on a wooden dome to cover the courtyard began on 10 September 1782 and was completed on 31 January 1783. The wooden dome was destroyed by fire in 1802. An imperial decree of 4 September 1807 stated that the hall was to be covered by a dome with cast-iron vertical arches covered in tinned copper. The replacement was complete in 1811. The building, now made entirely of stone, brick, iron and copper, was considered fireproof. In 1854 there was another fire in the building.

By the start of the Second French Empire (1852–70) the hall was no longer used to store flour. It was too small to serve the needs of the two million inhabitants of Paris and had become a sort of bourse, or exchange for titles to grain from Beauce, Brie and Picardy, and flour from the mills of Seine-et-Marne and Seine-et-Oise. The grain and flour was then delivered via rail direct from the provinces to the bakers and merchants. Fortunes were made and lost through speculation, not always honestly. The exchange was closed in 1873. In 1885 the building was assigned to the Commodities Exchange.

== Structure ==
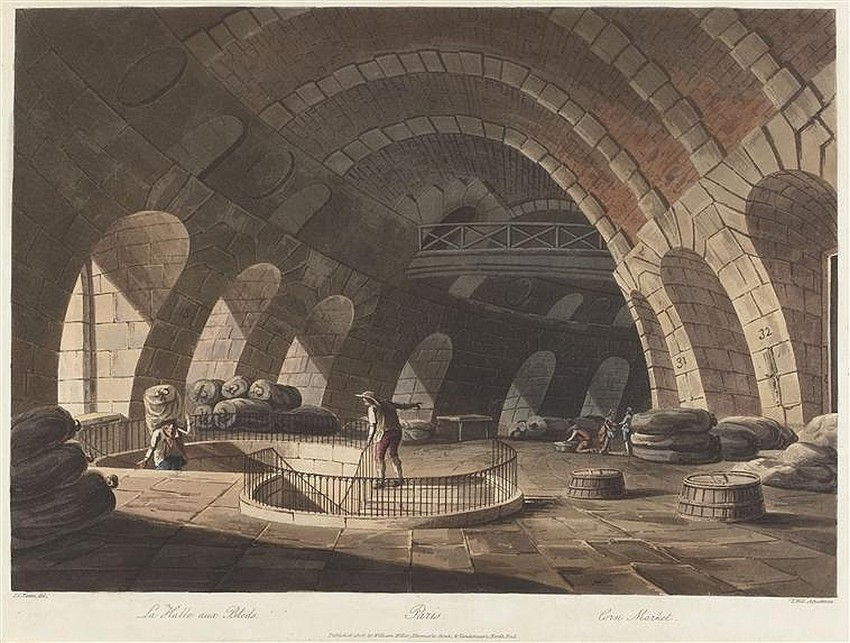
Vaulted attic of the exchange

The building was circular, with an exterior diameter of 68.19 metres (223.7 ft), and enclosed a round court with a diameter of 19.5 metres (64 ft). The building was pierced by 28 arcades on the ground floor, and the same number of windows on the floor above. The upper floor was reached by a double stairway, so that those going up one stairway would not meet those going down the other. Originally there was no roof over the central courtyard.

In 1782 François-Joseph Bélanger (1744–1818) proposed to add an iron cupola to cover the courtyard, but his plan was rejected. Instead, from 1782 to 1783 a laminated wood dome was built to a design by Jacques-Guillaume Legrand (1753–1807) and Jacques Molinos (1743–1831) based on the principles defined by Philibert de l'Orme (c. 1514–1570). The wooden dome was pierced by 25 large skylights. These took the form of continuous glass ribbons between the ribs of the dome. Even in dull and overcast weather they let in a considerable amount of light. The dome was almost 100 metres (330 ft) in circumference, and its summit was 33 metres (108 ft) above ground level. The interior of the rotunda was decorated with medallion portraits of Louis XVI, police lieutenant Jean-Charles-Pierre Lenoir (1732–1807) and Philibert Delorme, inventor of the technique used to make the dome. During the French Revolution (1789–99) the medallions of the king and Lenoir were destroyed in 1791.

On 16 October 1802 the cupola was destroyed by fire. The Minister of the Interior ran a competition for a replacement dome, and Bélanger resubmitted his design from 1782. In 1806 Jean-Baptiste Launay presented a model for a cast-iron dome for the market to the Exposition des produits de l'industrie française. On 17 January 1807 the Ministry of the Interior jury rejected Bélanger's design, which they considered to be in bad taste, and chose a more traditional design for a stone roof. However, under pressure from the Minister, the commission selected the iron dome on 20 August 1807.

Construction of the iron dome covered in sheets of copper began in 1809 and was completed in 1811. The engineer François Brunet assisted Bélanger in the calculations and design of the dome, which had a diameter of more than 39 metres (128 ft). It was made of 51 sections, corresponding to the midpoints of the 25 arches of the rotunda, with each section made of two beams connected by spacers. The frame weighed 220 tons and the copper sheets weighed 29 tons. The 25 windows of the old cupola were replaced by a roof lantern that illuminated the dome. The lantern had a diameter of 31 feet (9.4 m). Victor Hugo mocked the dome on his 1831 novel Notre-Dame de Paris, calling it an English jockey-cap on a large scale. The copper sheets were replaced by glass in 1838.

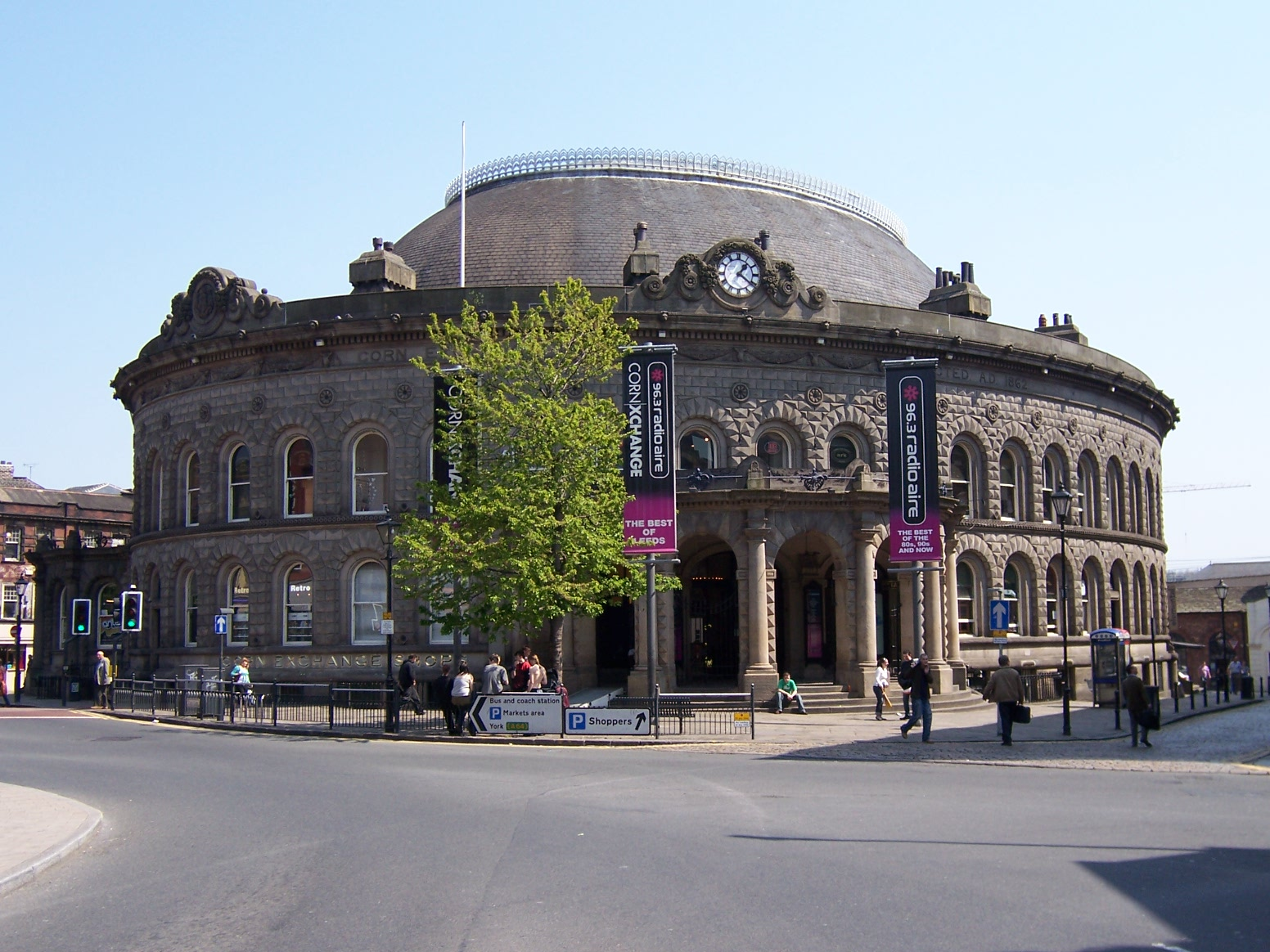
Leeds Corn Exchange

== Influence ==
When Thomas Jefferson (1743–1826) visited Paris he was highly impressed by the wooden dome, which he called the "most superb thing on earth". He proposed to copy the dome's design in three buildings in Washington, D.C. – the House chamber in the south wing of the Capitol, the White House and the Navy Yard dry dock. Latrobe was invited to Washington to take responsibility for the Capitol building as "surveyor of the public buildings". He proposed a variant of the Halle aux blés dome. The chamber would be roofed by a low-rising dome that would be hidden on the outside by the balustrade. After some delay, Jefferson accepted the modified design.

The interior of the Brighton Dome incorporates elements of the wooden dome's design. It was built for the future king George IV in (1803–08). The iron dome was copied in later buildings in England such as the London Coal Exchange (1846–49) by James Bunstone Bunning and the Leeds Corn Exchange (1861–63) by Cuthbert Brodrick.

In his Travels in France, 18th-century agriculturist Arthur Young describes the building in terms of extreme admiration:

By far the most finest thing I have yet seen at Paris is the Halle aux bleds, or corn market: it is a vast rotunda; the roof is entirely of wood, upon a new principle of carpentry, to describe which would demand plates and long explanations; the gallery is 150 yards round, consequently the diameter is as many feet: it is as light as if suspended by the fairies. In the ground area, wheat, pease [sic], beans, lentils, are stored and sold. In the surrounding divisions, flour on wooden stands. You pass by staircases doubly winding within each other to spacious apartments for rye, barley, oats, &c. The whole is so well planned, and so admirably executed, that I know of no public building that exceeds it in either France or England.

In his only criticism, Young notes that the building should have been built on the shore of the Seine, so that grain would have to be transported less distance once unloaded from the boats.

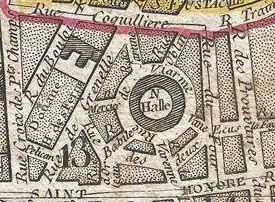
:Hall's location in 1797

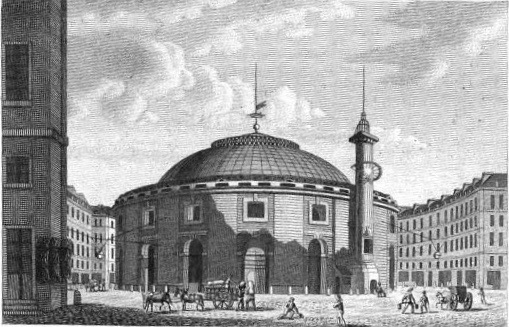
Halle aux blés in 1818

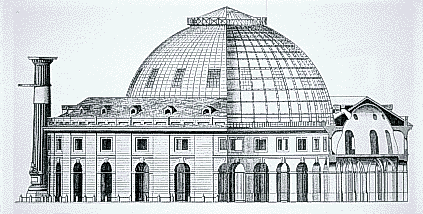
Architect's drawing

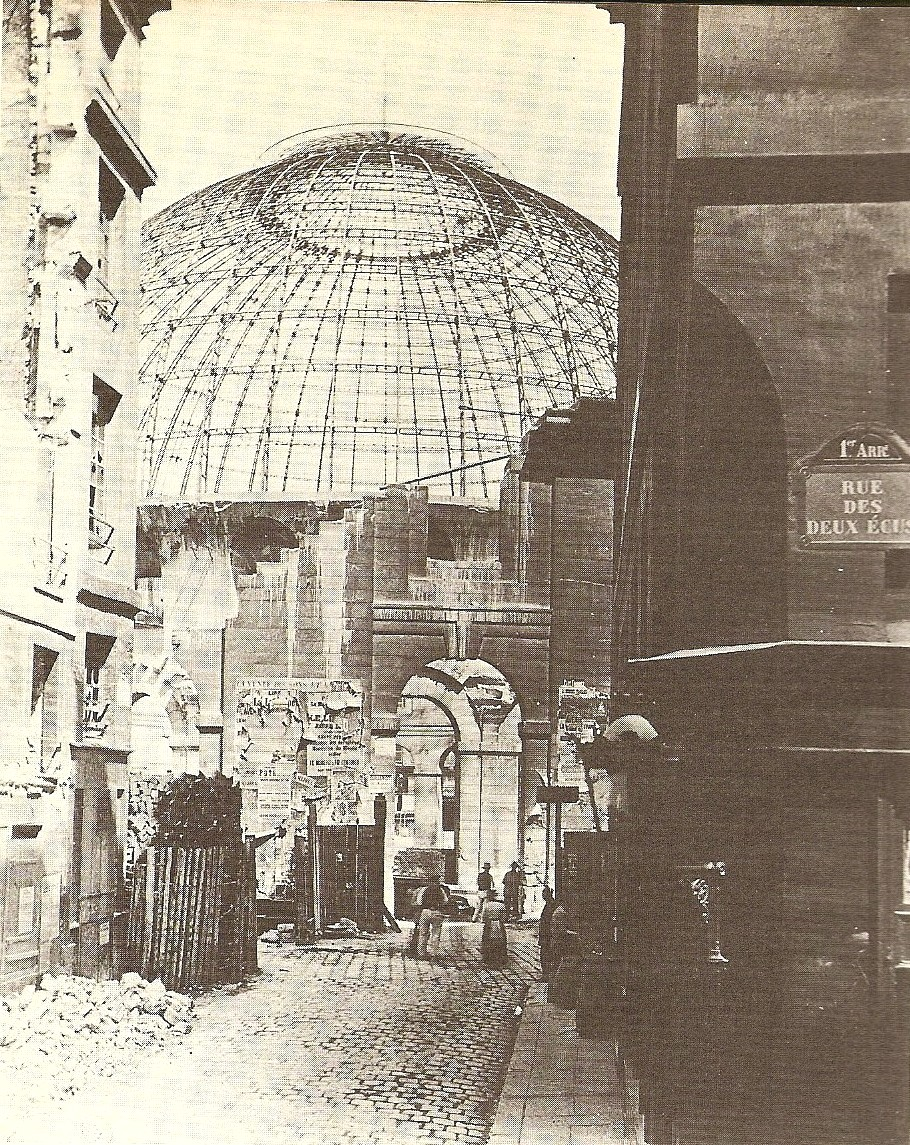
Demolition work in 1887

== See also ==
- 18th-century Western domes

== Sources ==
- "Bourse de Commerce - Paris 1e". 1900larnouveau (in French).
- "Bourse de Commerce". Structurae (in French).
- "Bourse de Commerce". Time Out.
- Costaz, Cl. Anthelme, ed. (1806), Les objets envoyés à l'exposition des produits de l'industrie française (in French), Paris : Imprimerie impériale: S.E.M de Champagny, ministre de l’intérieur, p. 349
- Dulaure, J. A. (1824). Histoire physique, civile et morale de Paris, depuis les premiers temps historiques jusqu'a nos jours (in French). Vol. VIII.
- Field, Cynthia R.; Gournay, Isabelle; Somma, Thomas P. (2013-02-04). Paris on the Potomac: The French Influence on the Architecture and Art of Washington. Ohio University Press. ISBN 978-0-8214-4239-5.
- Genouillac, Henri Gourdon de (1881). Paris à travers les siècles: Histoire nationale de Paris et des Parisiens depuis la fondation de Lutèce jusq'à nos jours (in French). F. Roy.
- Hillairet, Jacques (1978). "Connaissance du Vieux Paris" (in French). Editions de Minuit.
- "Octroi - Consommation de Paris". Annuaire de Paris: 1872 (in French). Guillaumin. 1872.
- "The Royal Stables & Riding House". Brighton Dome. Archived from the original on 2015-10-15.
- Touchard-Lafosse, Georges (1834). Histoire de Paris (in French).
