= Nicolas Le Camus de Mézières =

French architect and theoretician (1721–1793)

Nicolas Le Camus de Mézières (March 26, 1721 – July 27, 1793) was a French architect and theoretician. He was born and died in Paris. He published several works on architectural and related subjects, including Architecture of Expression, and The Theatre of Desire at the End of the Ancien Régime; Or, The Analogy of Fiction with Architectural Innovation.

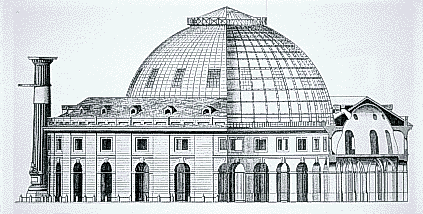
Halle aux blés (Corn Exchange)

Le Camus designed the Halle aux blés (Corn Exchange) with a circular central courtyard and a double staircase. The layout of that building has been retained in the present Bourse de commerce. Le Camus developed a theory of architecture in which the character of a building should express its destination or the social status of its client. Unlike previous character theories in architecture, Le Camus's theory was based on an explicit analogy between architecture and theatre. His architectural mode of expression followed a temporal progression similar to the dramatic unfolding of a play, and gradations in ornamentation throughout the interior of a building resembled a succession of stage sets in a theatrical performance.

== Publications ==
- Dissertation de la Compagnie des architectes-experts des bâtiments à Paris en réponse au mémoire de M. Pâris-Duverney sur la théorie et la pratique des gros bois de charpente, 1763, 12mo.
- Le génie de l'architecture, ou L'analogie de cet art avec nos sensations, 1780, 8vo.
  - The Genius of Architecture or The analogy of that art with our sensations; introd. by Robin Middleton; transl. by David Britt. Santa Monica: Getty Center for the History of Art and the Humanities, 1992
- L'Esprit des almanachs ou analyse critique et raisonnée de tous les almanachs anciens et modernes, 1781, 16mo.
- Le Guide de ceux qui veulent bâtir, ouvrage dans lequel on donne les renseignements nécessaires pour se conduire pendant la construction, & prévenir les fraudes qui pourraient s'y glisser, 1781, 2 vol. 8vo.
- Traité de la force des bois, ouvrage essentiel, qui donne les moyens de procurer plus de solidité aux edifices, de connaître la bonne & la mauvaise qualité des bois, de calculer leur force, & de ménager près de moitié sur ceux qu'on emploie ordinairement, 1782, 8vo.
- Description des eaux de Chantilly et du Hameau, 1783, 8vo.
- Plans, Dessins, Détails et Devis de construction de la nouvelle Halle aux grains de Paris, 1786
- Lettre sur la manière de rendre incombustible toute salle de spectacle
- Lettre sur les fours et la cuisson des tuiles et briques
- Deux différentes lettres sur la force des bois
- Lettre contenant un projet pour le chef-lieu de l'Université, avec plan général
- Aabba, ou le Triomphe de l'innocence, Roman grec
- Mes Délassements
