= François-Joseph Bélanger =

French architect (1744–1818)

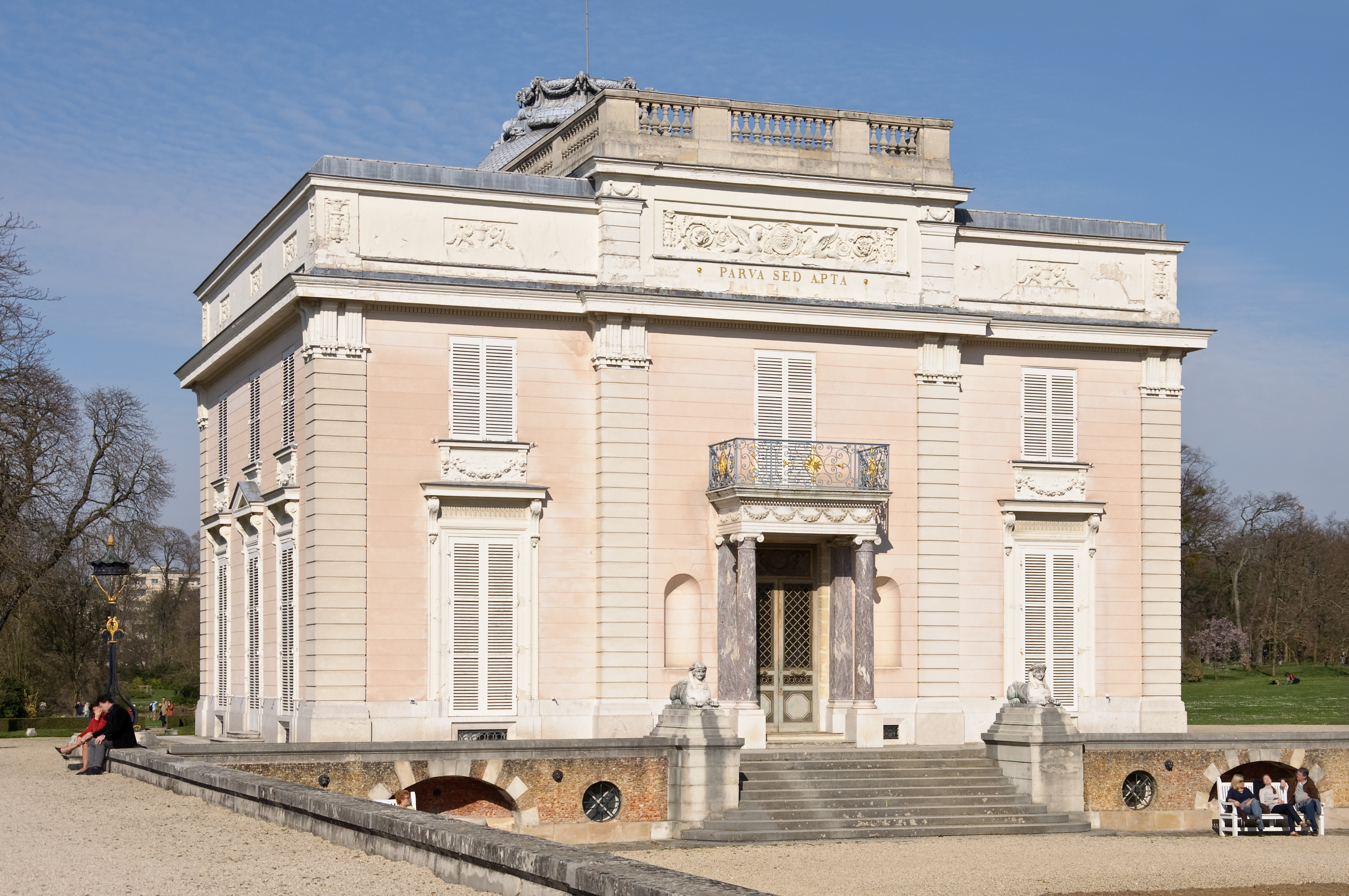
Chateau de Bagatelle, Paris

François-Joseph Bélanger (French pronunciation: [fʁɑ̃swa ʒozɛf belɑ̃ʒe]; 12 April 1744 – 1 May 1818) was a French architect and decorator working in the Neoclassic style.

== Life ==
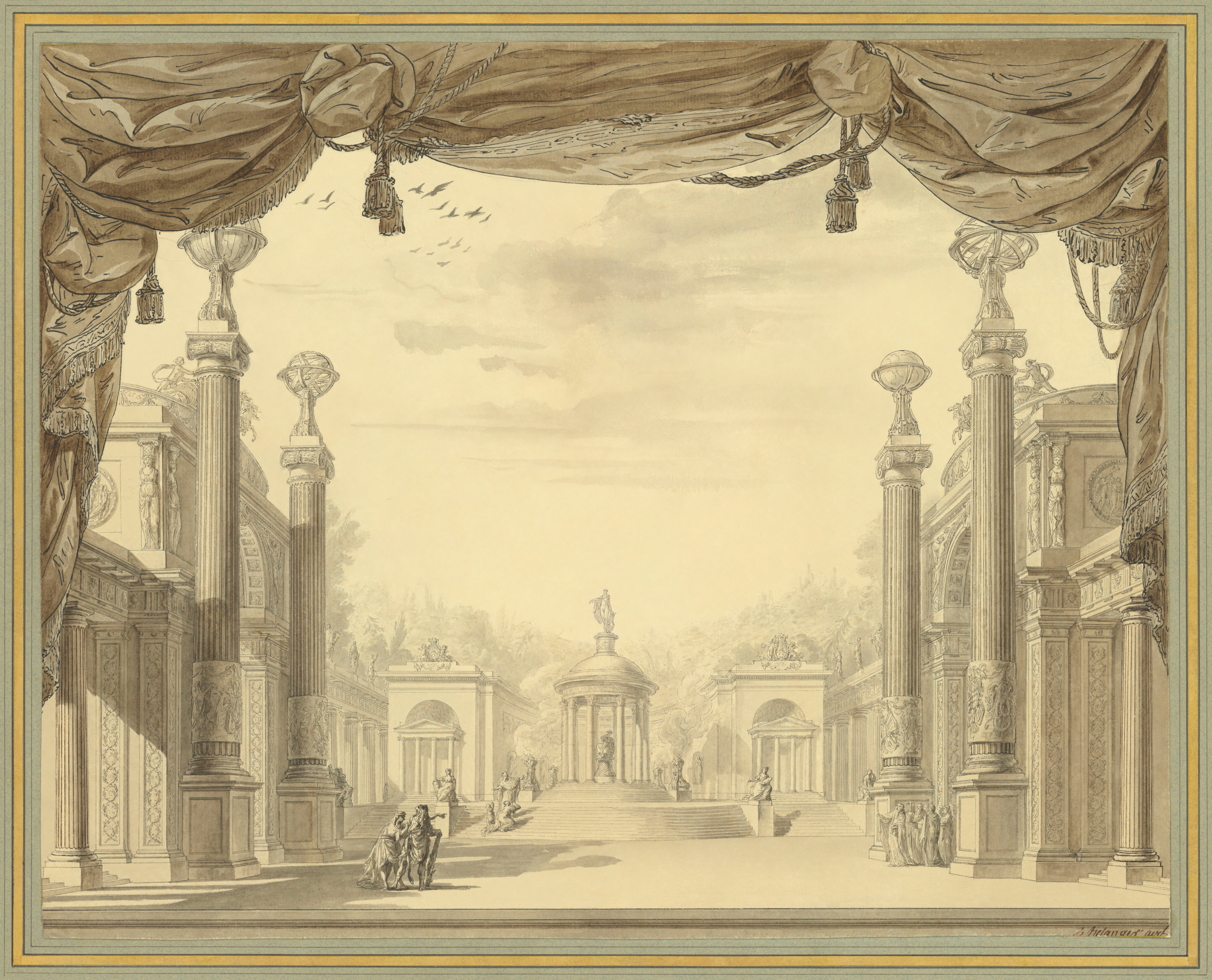
Set design for the 1776 French-language première of Christoph Willibald Gluck's Alceste

Born in Paris, Bélanger attended the Académie Royale d'Architecture (1764–1766) where he studied under Julien-David Le Roy and Pierre Contant d'Ivry. He did not win the coveted Prix de Rome that would have sent him to study at Rome; however, through Le Roy's circle he was introduced to some advanced neoclassical designers, such as Charles-Louis Clérisseau.

Bélanger began his career in 1767, working at the Menus Plaisirs du Roi designing ephemeral decorations for court fêtes, and by 1777 he was its director. In this position, he was in charge of the funeral preparations for Louis XV and the coronation coach of Louis XVI. The jewel cabinet he designed for the wedding of the Dauphin to Marie-Antoinette has not survived. However, a maquette of another design that had been also entered into the competition, made of wax and painted paper on a wooden frame, (now at the Walters Art Museum, Baltimore), shows the style of the cabinets that were made at the time. It is Neoclassical taste, with caryatid demi-figures and framed medallions in blue and white

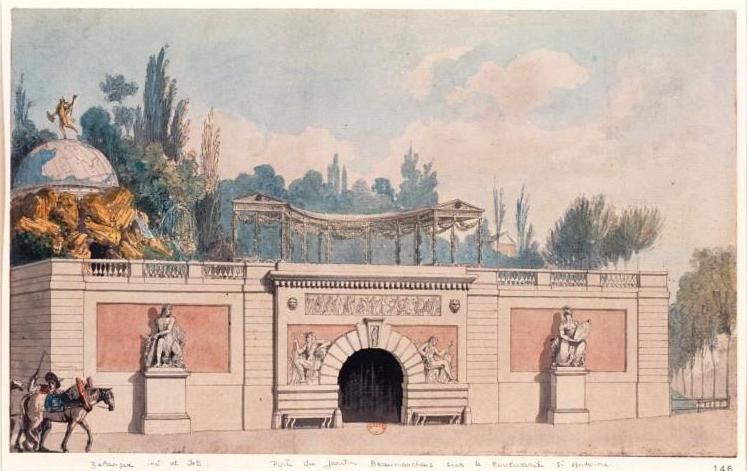
Entrance to the Jardin Beaumarchais

Ten years later he purchased the position of chief architect to Monsieur, the comte d'Artois, brother of Louis XVI, thanks to the protection of the marquis de Voyer, Marc-René de Voyer d'Argenson, famous patron of that time. For him Bélanger designed and constructed the party pavilion Château de Bagatelle in the Bois de Boulogne, 1777, winning his patron's bet with the Queen by completing the house in sixty-three days (and nights) and introducing décors in the style Étrusque. Bélanger constructed the Folie Saint James, a French landscape garden, in Neuilly from 1777 to 1780, and worked for the comte d'Artois at the Château of Maisons-Lafitte. During the Revolution he spent some time in the prison of Saint-Lazare.

=== The Bourse ===
In 1813, at the death of Alexandre-Théodore Brongniart he presented himself successfully as candidate for completing the Paris Bourse. From 1808 to 1813 he rebuilt the cupola of the Halle au blé, the former grain market that is the present Bourse de commerce of Paris. This was among the earliest uses of iron to enclose a long-span interior space.

Bélanger designed and constructed numerous hôtels particuliers for Parisian aristocrats and bankers. He designed the Château de Méréville for Jean-Joseph de Laborde, 1784–86. He designed interiors for the Hôtel Baudart de Saint-James, 12 Place Vendôme, and influenced garden designs of the epoch.

He supervised the workshop supported by the connoisseur Louis-Marie-Augustin, duc d'Aumont, that produced hardstone and porphyry vases, pedestals, and tabletops, which were mounted with gilt-bronze ornaments to his designs. The late duc d'Aumont's collection was dispersed at auction, 1782: among the purchasers was the Queen.

He died at Paris in 1818. He was married to Anne Victoire Dervieux. Among the architects trained in his atelier was Joseph-Jacques Ramée.
