= Medici column =

Historical monument in Paris

Coordinates: 48°51′45″N 2°20′34″E

- Colonne Médicis
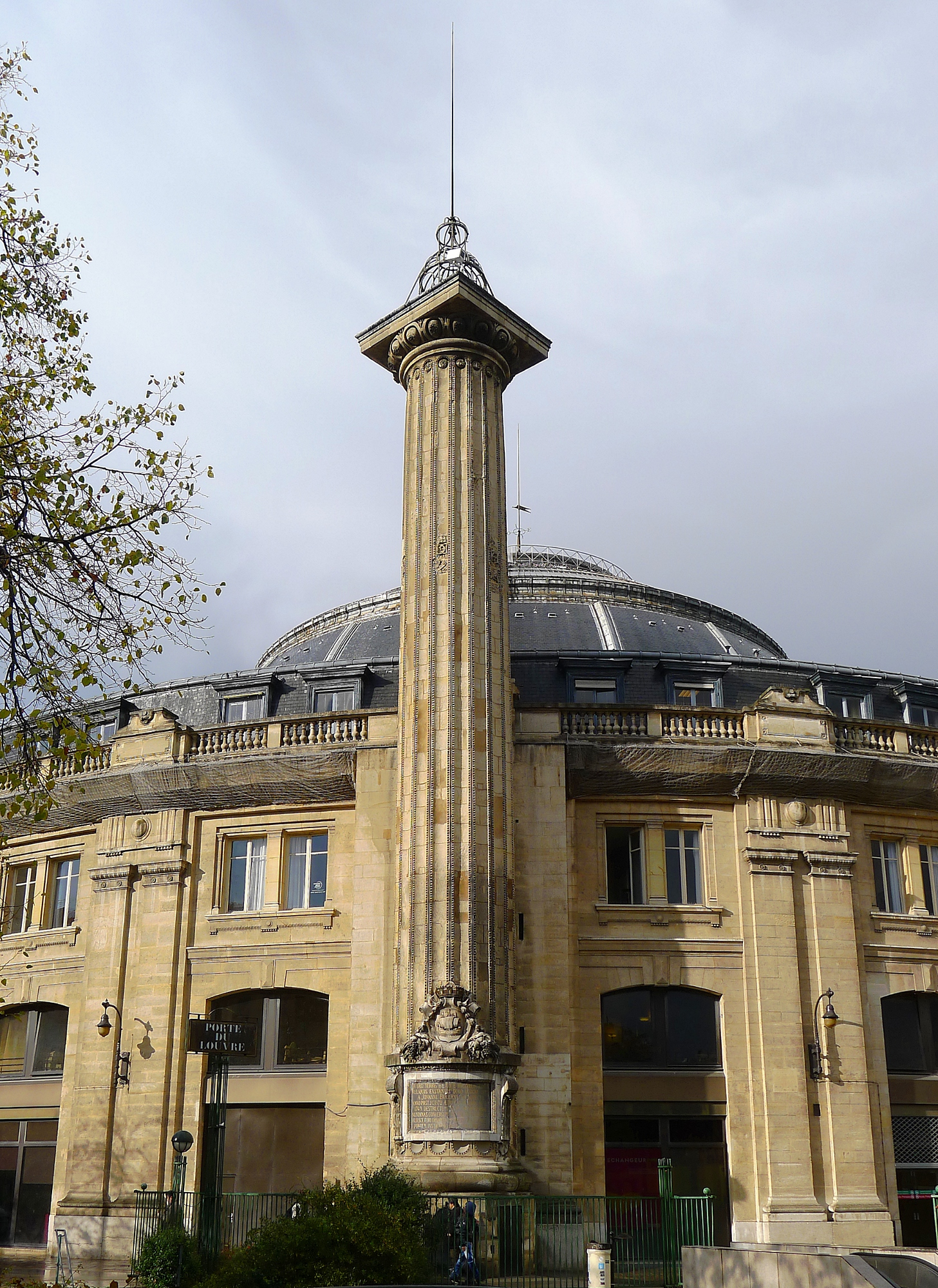
- Medici column in 2011
- Interactive map of Medici column
- Location: Bourse de commerce, Paris, France
- Designer: Jean Bullant
- Height: 28m
- Beginning date: 1575

The Medici column is a monument in Paris, France, located in front of the Bourse de commerce. It has been listed since 1862 as a monument historique by the French Ministry of Culture, and is the only remnant of the former Hôtel de Soissons.

== History ==
The column was built in 1575 by Jean Bullant at the request of Catherine de' Medici. It is believed it may be a tribute to Henri II, who was killed after a prediction was made by Nostradamus. Catherine also had a love for astrology and when Nostradamus left Paris, she asked to have the column built so that Cosimo Ruggieri could use it.

== Description ==
The fluted column is 28 meters high. Inside are 147 spiral steps which lead to a viewing platform. It used to have a glass roof. Now the platform is covered with an iron frame. The four corners of the columns top match the four points of a compass. The column was not an original part of the plan when Catherine de' Medici was planning the building of her home, the Hôtel de Soissons, to which the column connected.

== Location ==
Located near the Métro stations: Louvre - Rivoli and Les Halles.
