= Château de Montceaux =

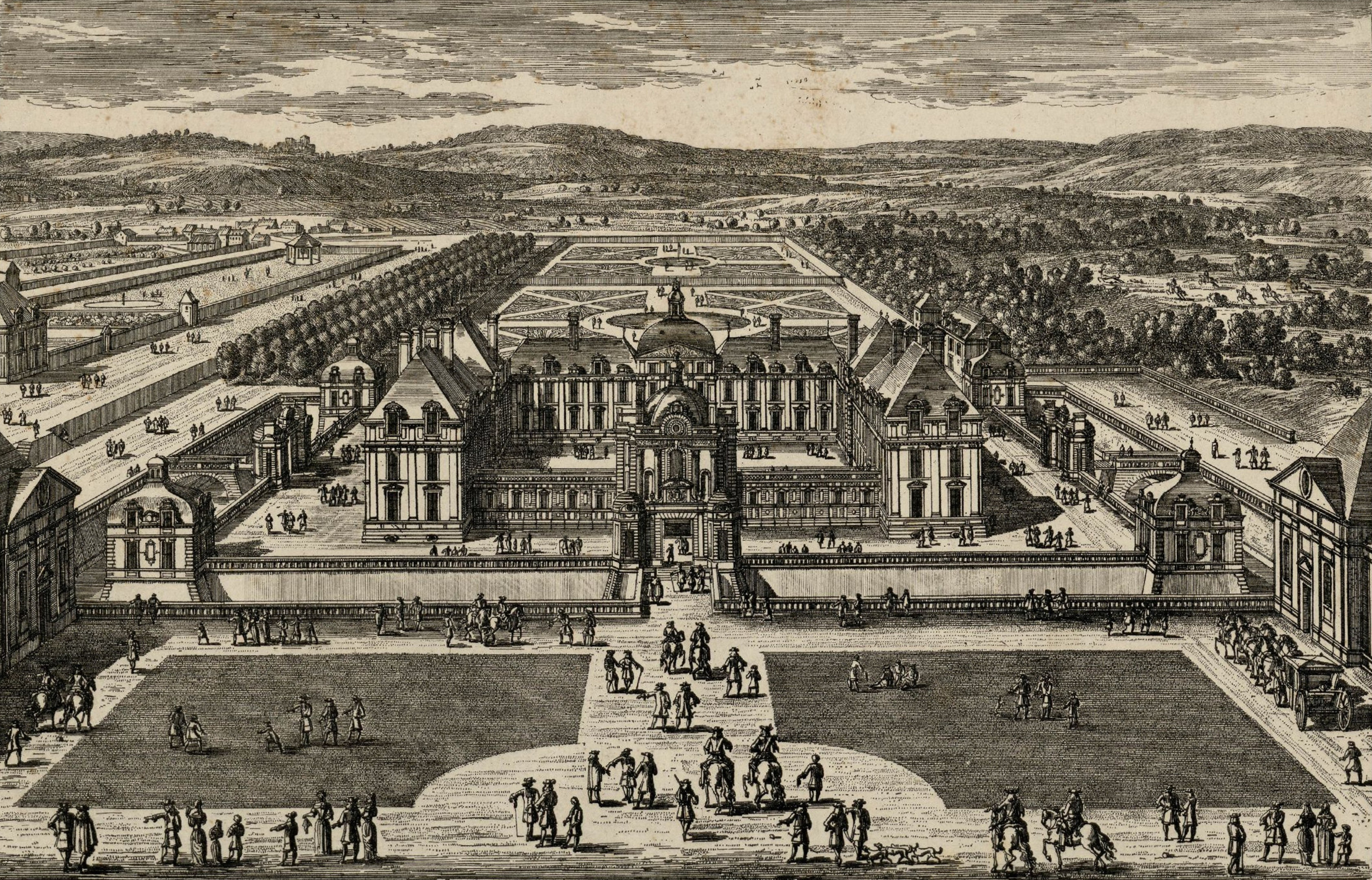
- In the 17th century

- Location within France

General information
- Architectural style: French Renaissance,
- Location: Montceaux-lès-Meaux (Seine-et-Marne), France
- Coordinates: 48.943056°N 2.986111°E
- Construction started: c. 1520

Website
- www.chateaudemontceaux.fr

The Château de Montceaux, also known as the Château de Montceaux-en-Brie or the Château de Montceaux-lès-Meaux, was a royal French Renaissance château, located in what is now the commune of Montceaux-lès-Meaux in the Seine-et-Marne department of north-central France. Mostly demolished in 1798, only vestiges remain.

== History ==
Henry II gave it to Catherine de' Medici in 1556, and it was her earliest building project. The building consisted of a central pavilion housing a straight staircase, and two wings with a pavilion at each end. Catherine wanted to cover the alley in the garden where Henry played pall-mall, an early form of croquet. For this commission, Philibert de l'Orme built her a grotto set on a base made to look like natural rock, from which guests could watch the games while taking refreshments. The grotto was completed in 1558 but has not survived.

After Henry II's death in 1559, Catherine kept the château and stayed there with the court on numerous occasions. The most famous incident connected with the château is the "Surprise of Meaux" (1567) in which Huguenot troops planned to kidnap the queen and her son, King Charles IX, but she learned of the plot and hurried back to the Paris, surrounded by regiments of Swiss Guards. After Henry II's death, Catherine frequently ran short of money due to her other projects and the Wars of Religion, and little further work appears to have been done at Montceaux. The château remained incomplete at the time of her death in 1589.

In 1596, Henry IV conferred the title Marquise de Montceaux on his mistress, Gabrielle d'Estrées, and she purchased the Château de Montceaux at auction from the estate of Catherine de' Medici for 39,000 écus, money which he probably gave her. After Gabrielle's death in 1599, he acquired it from their young son, César, Duc de Vendôme, and in 1601 gave it to his new wife, Marie de' Medici, in gratitude for the birth of the Dauphin, the future Louis XIII. The château ceased to be used as a royal residence after 1640, and had fallen into ruin by the time it was demolished by revolutionary decree in 1798. Some ruins remain, a chapel and the buildings of the forecourt, transformed into private dwellings; parts of the east wing are farm buildings.

The château is listed as a Monument historique since 2005 by the French Ministry of Culture.

== Gallery ==
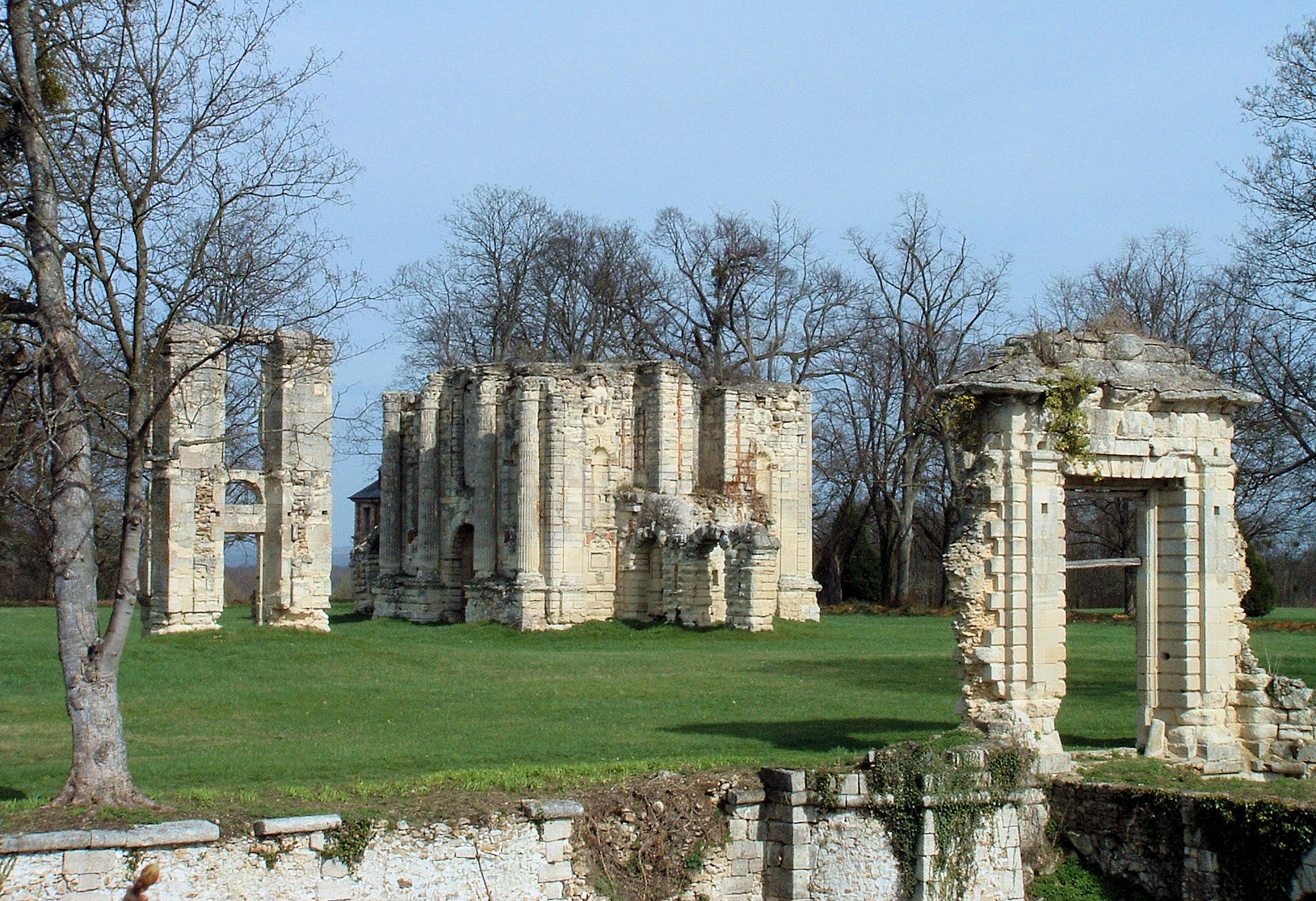
Ruins of the château

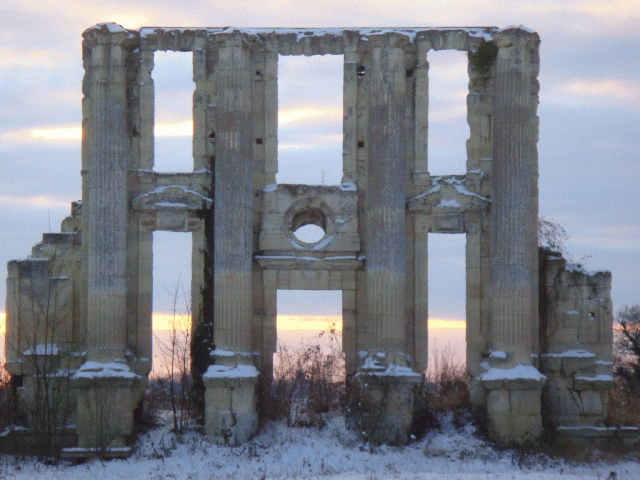
Columns

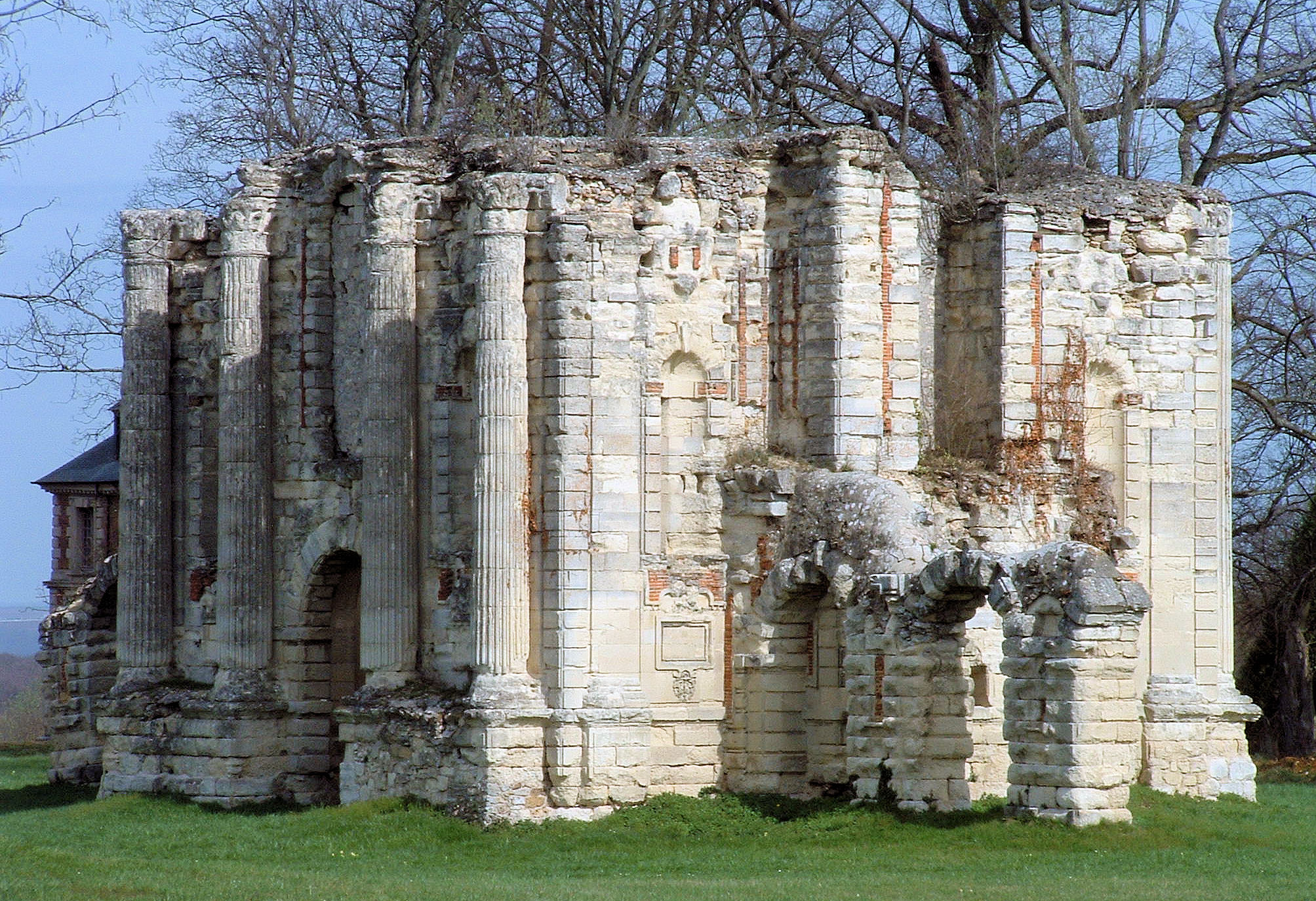
Ruins of the entrance pavilion

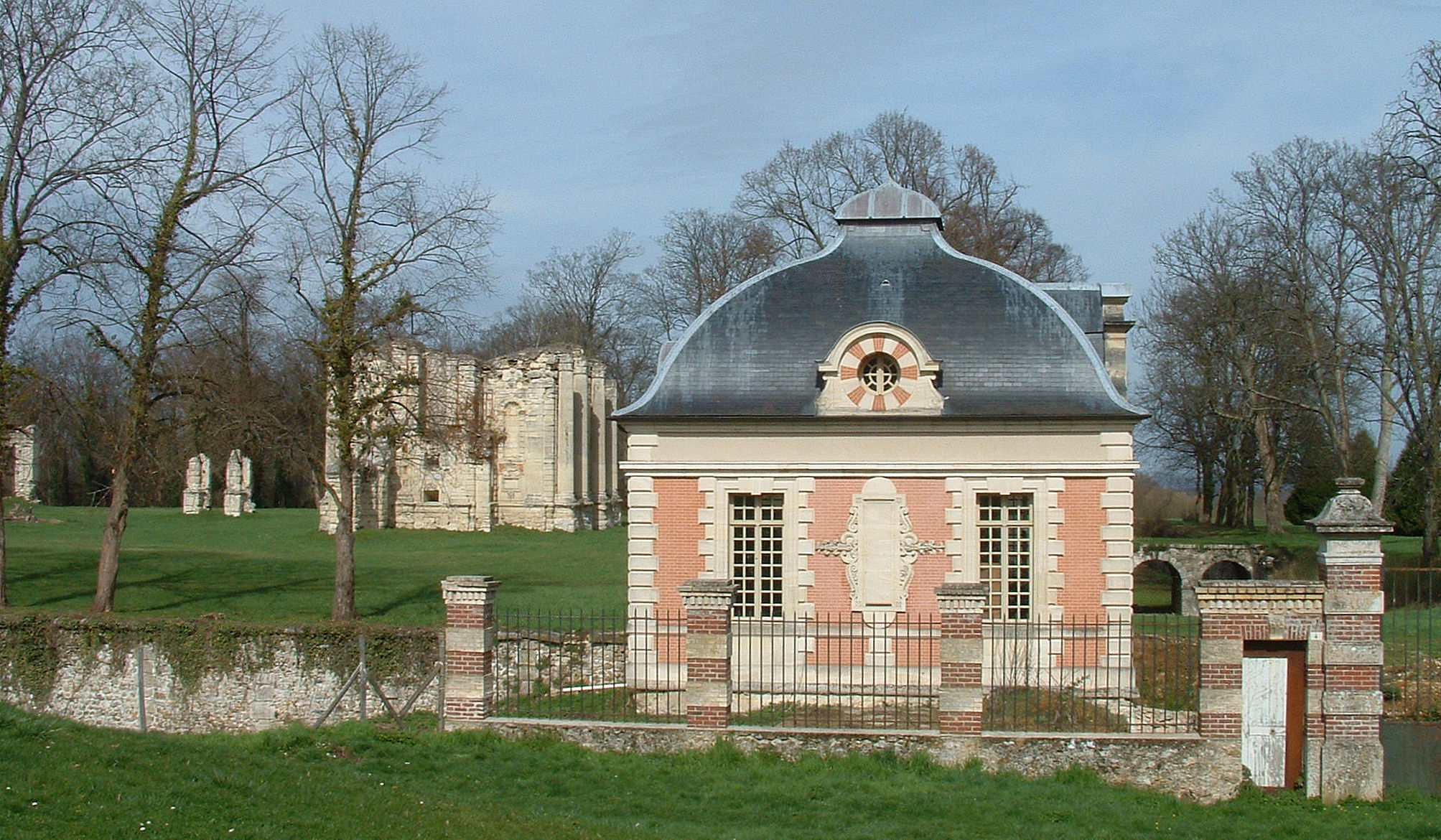
Angle pavilion, restored in March 2005

== Bibliography ==
- Babelon, Jean-Pierre (1989). Châteaux de France au siècle de la Renaissance. Paris: Flammarion/Picard. ISBN 9782080120625.
- Coope, Rosalys (1959). "The Château of Montceaux-en-Brie", Journal of the Warburg and Courtauld Institutes, vol. 22, no. 1/2 (January–June), pp. 71–87. JSTOR 750560.
- Knecht, R. J. (1998). Catherine de' Medici. London and New York: Longman. ISBN 0582082412.
