= Montceaux-lès-Meaux =

- Commune
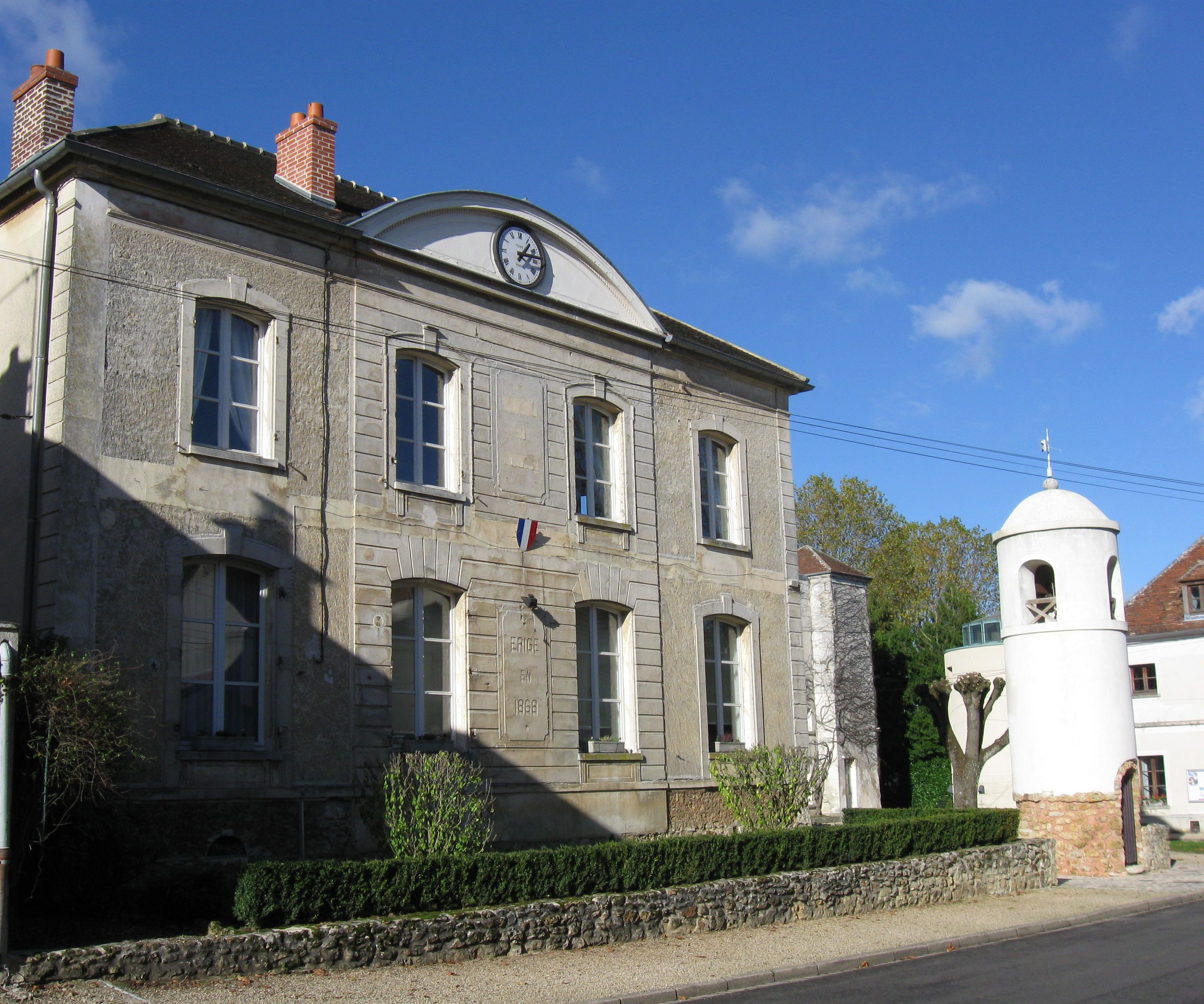
- The town hall in Montceaux-lès-Meaux
- Location of Montceaux-lès-Meaux
- Location within France Location within Île-de-France (region)
- Coordinates: 48°56′28″N 2°59′08″E
- Country: France
- Region: Île-de-France
- Department: Seine-et-Marne
- Arrondissement: Meaux
- Canton: La Ferté-sous-Jouarre
- Intercommunality: Pays de Meaux

Government
  - Mayor (2024–2026): Vincent Vyt
- Area^{1}: 4.72 km^{2} (1.82 sq mi)
- Highest elevation: 172 m (564 ft)
- Lowest elevation: 86 m (282 ft)
- Population (2023): 669
  - Density: 142/km^{2} (367/sq mi)
- Time zone: UTC+01:00 (CET)
  - Summer (DST): UTC+02:00 (CEST)
- INSEE/Postal code: 77300 /77470
- ^{1} French Land Register data, which excludes lakes, ponds, glaciers > 1 km^{2} (0.386 sq mi or 247 acres) and river estuaries.

Montceaux-lès-Meaux (French pronunciation: [mɔ̃so lɛ mo], literally Montceaux near Meaux) is a commune in the Seine-et-Marne department in the Île-de-France region in north-central France.

== Château ==
The town is known for the former Château de Montceaux, which Henri II gave to Catherine de' Medici in 1556. Only vestiges remain.

Castle ruins

The restored outbuildings

Former hunting lodge

== Demographics ==
Inhabitants are called Monticellois.

== See also ==
- Communes of the Seine-et-Marne department
