= Hôtel de Soissons =

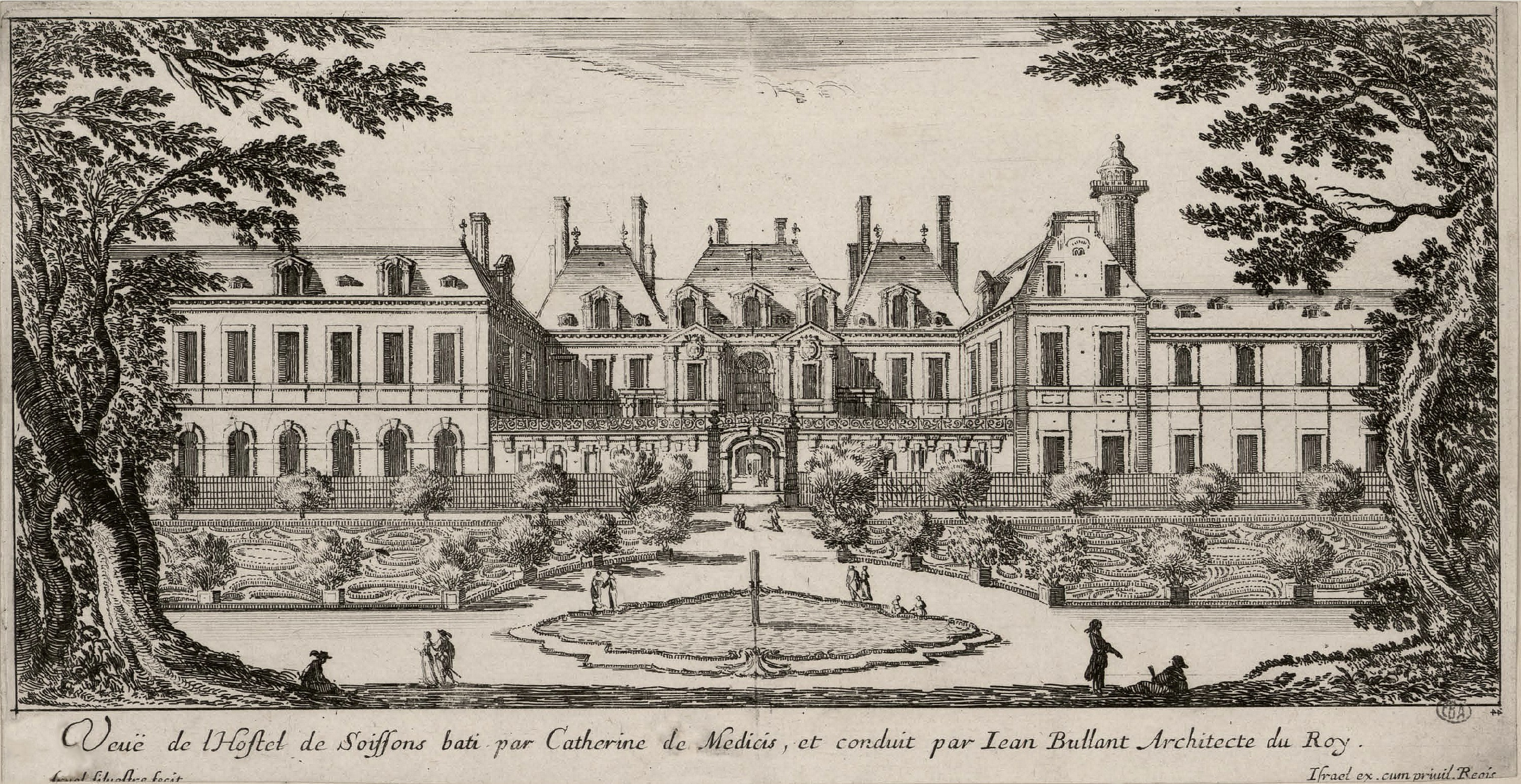
- 1650 engraving by Israël Silvestre of the Hôtel de la Reine in Paris. The central and right-hand sections are those built during Catherine's lifetime. The Colonne de l'Horoscope can be seen in the background, to the right.

- Location within Paris

General information
- Type: Hôtel particulier
- Classification: Demolished
- Location: 2, rue de Viarmes, Paris (1st arrondissement), France
- Coordinates: 48.862731°N 2.342780°E
- Construction started: 1574
- Completed: 1584
- Demolished: 1748

Design and construction
- Architect: Jean Bullant

The Hôtel de Soissons (French pronunciation: [otɛl də swasɔ̃]) was a hôtel particulier (grand house) built in Paris, France, between 1574 and 1584 for Catherine de' Medici (1519–89) by the architect Jean Bullant (1515–78). It replaced a series of earlier buildings on the same site. After Catherine's death the hotel was enlarged and embellished. The last owner, Victor Amadeus I, Prince of Carignano, installed the Paris Bourse in the gardens, He was forced to sell it in 1740 to pay his debts. It was demolished in 1748 and the materials sold. A corn exchange was built on the site, later replaced by the present Bourse de commerce. A column, thought to have been used for astrological observations, is all that remains.

== Earlier buildings ==
There was a hôtel on the site owned by Jean II de Nesle at the start of the 13th century. He had no heirs, and in 1232 ceded the property to king Louis IX of France (1214–70), who gave it to his mother Blanche of Castile (1188–1252) for use as her residence. King Philip IV of France (1268–1314), who inherited it, offered the hôtel to his brother Charles, Count of Valois (1270–1325). The property then passed to the latter's son, King Philip VI of France (1293–1350), who gave it to John of Bohemia (1296–1346), Count of Luxembourg and King of Bohemia. His daughter Bonne of Bohemia (1315–49) inherited the hôtel in 1327. She married the future King John II of France (1319–64). Their son, King Charles V of France (1338–80) ceded the building in 1354 to Amadeus VI, Count of Savoy (1334–83).

The hôtel then belonged to Louis I, Duke of Anjou (1339–84). His widow Marie of Blois (1345–1404) sold it in 1388 to King Charles VI of France (1368–1422), who gave it to his brother, Louis I, Duke of Orléans (1372-1407). At the request of the confessor of King Charles VIII of France 1470–98), in 1498 Charles created a convent for "repentant girls", while the rest of the building was divided between the Constable of France and the Chancellor of the Duke of Orleans.

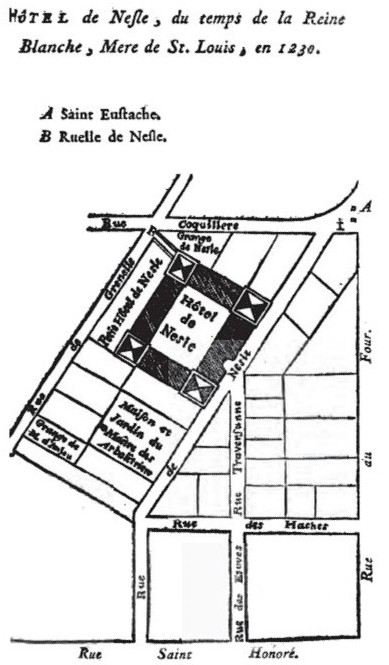
Hôtel de Nesle in 1230

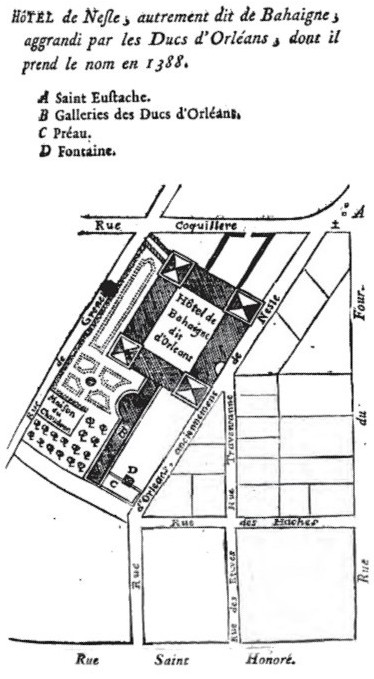
Hôtel de Bahaigne in 1388

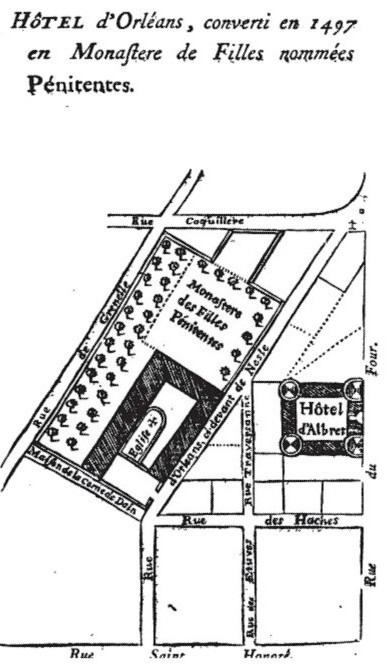
Monastere de Filles Pénitentes in 1497

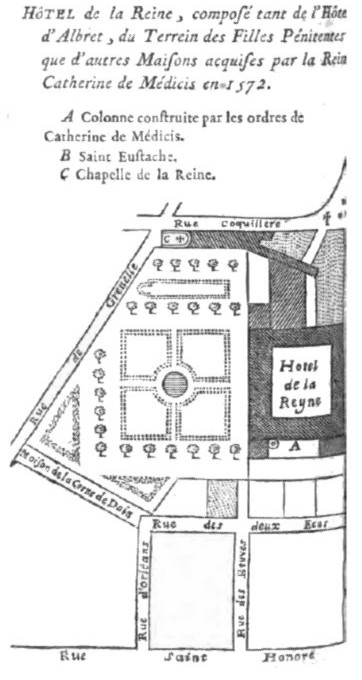
Hôtel de la Reine in 1572

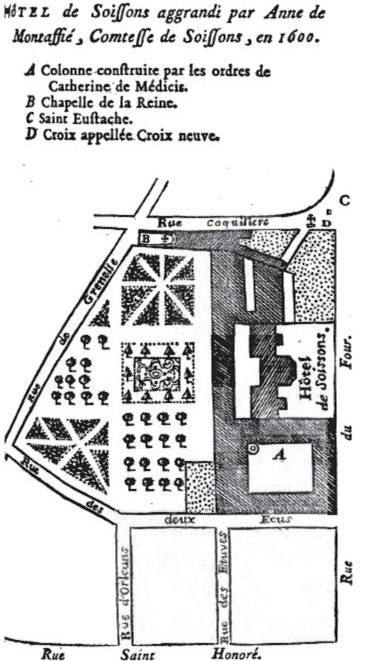
Hôtel de Soissons in 1600

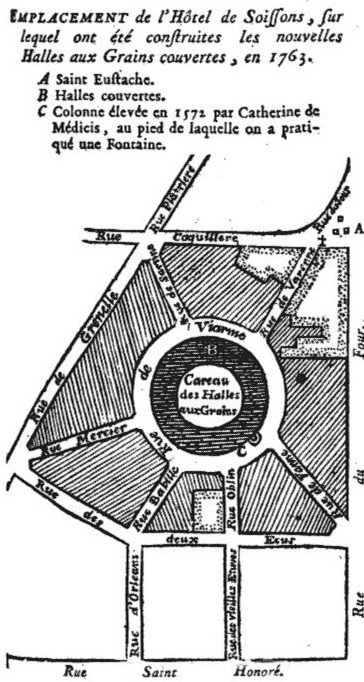
Halles aux Grains in 1763

== Hôtel de la Reine ==
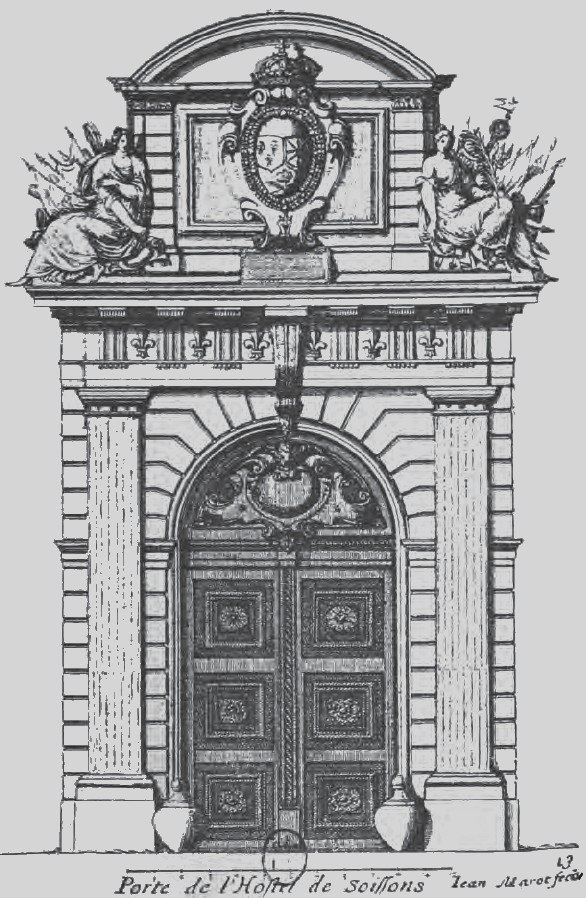
Door of the hotel drawn by Salomon de Brosse in 1611

In 1572 Catherine de Medici (1519–89), widow of Henry II of France (1519–59) and effective ruler of France, suddenly abandoned the Tuileries Palace, which she was building. She acquired and moved into the Hôtel d'Albret, various mansions beside the convent to the east, and began construction of what would be called the Hôtel de la Reine (Queen's House). The move may have been due to an astrological prediction. It is said that the astrologer Cosimo Ruggeri predicted that Catherine would die "near Saint-Germain", and the Tuileries Palace was near the church of Saint-Germain l'Auxerrois. When Catherine was dying in the Château de Blois the priest who gave her extreme unction was named Julien de Saint-Germain.

In 1572, Catherine commissioned Jean Bullant (1515–78) to build a new home for her within the Paris city walls. She had outgrown her apartments at the Louvre and needed more room for her swelling household. Between 1575 and 1583, for example, the number of Catherine's ladies-in-waiting rose from 68 to 111. To make space for the new scheme and its gardens, she had an entire area of Paris demolished. The area, in the parish of Saint-Eustache, included the Hôtel Guillart and the Hôtel d'Albret. The queen mother bought the buildings around the Hôtel d'Albret to incorporate in her residence in 1572, and then obtained the convent of repentant girls in exchange for the Saint-Magloire property that she owned on the Rue Saint-Denis. The newly acquired space became a huge garden. A beautiful reclining Venus in marble by Jean Goujon decorated the basin of one of the fountains in the gardens.

Jean Bullant supervised the work from 1572 until his death in 1578. The hôtel consisted of several apartments, including one for the queen mother and one for her granddaughter, Christina of Lorraine. The king and queen, Henry III of France (1551–1589) and Louise of Lorraine (1553-1601), also had their chambers. The hotel consisted of galleries and reception rooms, beautifully decorated and adorned with Catherine's art collections. It served as a framework for the social and political receptions of the court. The hôtel particulier (grand house) was built to Bullant's design between 1574 and 1584.

The new palace was known in Catherine's time as the Hôtel de la Reine and later as the Hôtel de Soissons. The original design was based on the Uffizi palace in Florence, but Catherine dropped that idea for a less costly plan after 1576. Engravings made by Israel Silvestre in about 1650 and a plan from about 1700 show that the Hôtel de la Reine possessed a central wing, a courtyard, and gardens. The central wing consisted of three large pavilions with tall, pitched roofs. In the middle, two tall projections decorated with pilasters flanked an arch. The walled gardens of the hôtel included an aviary, a lake with a water jet, and long avenues of trees. Catherine also installed an orangery that could be dismantled in winter.

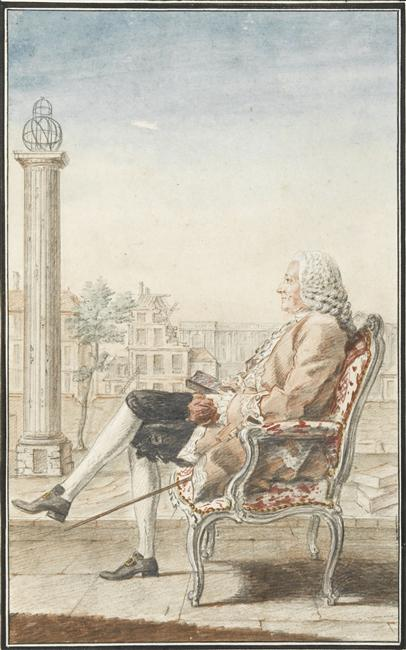
Louis Petit de Bachaumont watching over the Medici column during the destruction of the Hôtel de Soissons in 1748, by Louis Carrogis Carmontelle

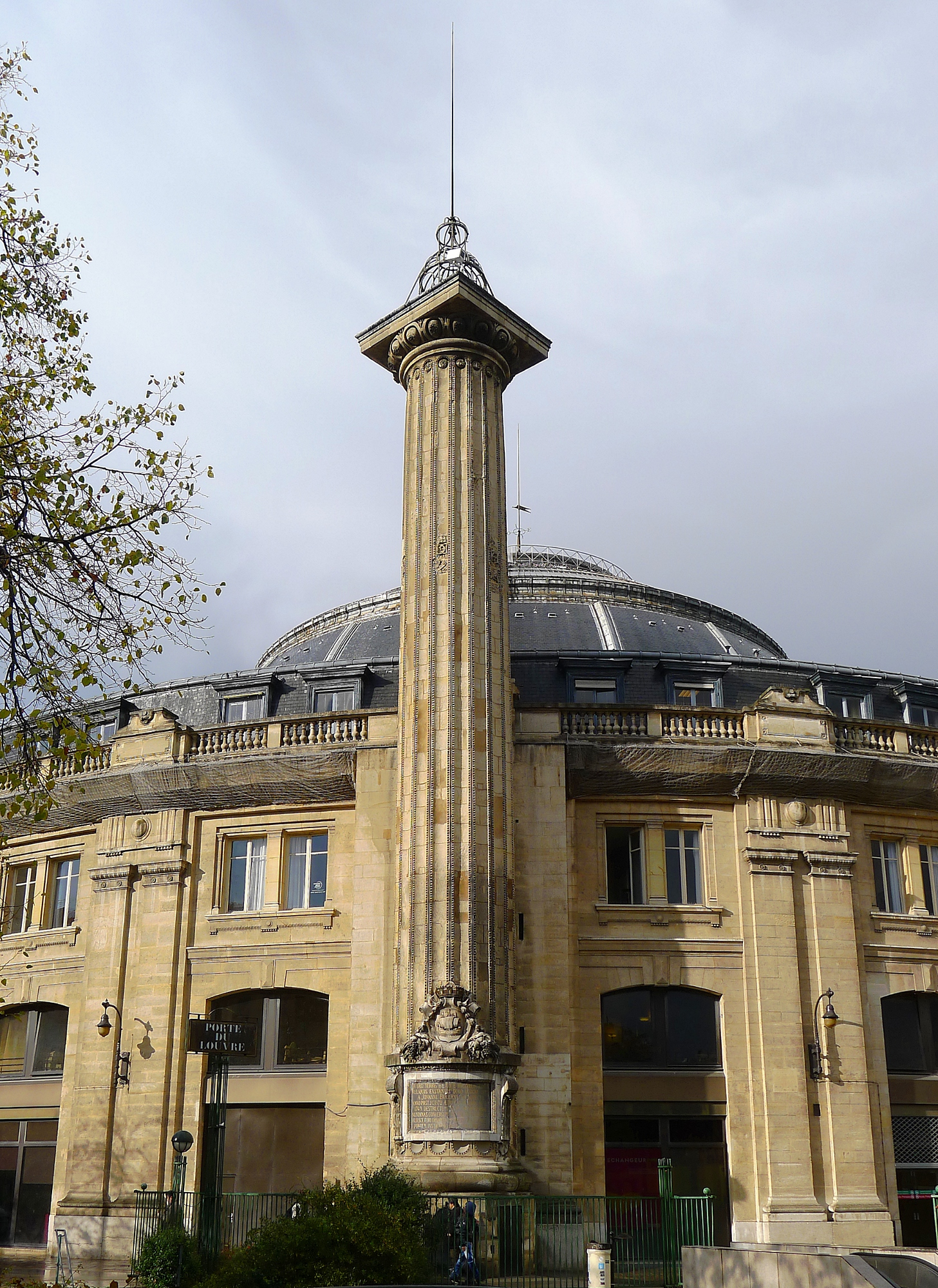
Medici column

A tower with an encaged platform, now called the Medici column, was built beside the hôtel. It is possible that the column was used for observations by the queen's personal astrologer, Cosimo Ruggeri of Florence. The staircase inside leads to a platform that can hold three persons and is topped by an iron cage. A balcony is thought to have once encircled the top. The single Doric column, known as the Colonne de l'Horoscope, stood in the courtyard. The column also seems to have had a memorial significance. Carvings of shattered mirrors, torn love-knots, and the intertwined letters "C" and "H"—all symbols of Catherine's grief at the loss of her husband—are embedded in the fluting. On the left of the stairway of the tower was a hall, the largest room in the complex. The central wing, as drawn by Silvestre from the garden, extended on its north side.

== History ==
In 1589, after the death of Catherine de Medici and the assassination of the Duke of Guise, the hotel was occupied by the princesses of the League (including Anna d'Este). It temporarily took the name of Hôtel des Princesses. During this period it was stripped of much of its furniture.

In 1601, after a series of disputes over the debts accumulated by Catherine de Medici, the heirs of the Queen yielded the hôtel to Catherine de Bourbon (1559-1604), sister of Henry IV of France (1553–1610). Many improvements were made to the hôtel over time, including a beautiful high portal in 1611 by Salomon de Brosse. On her death it was acquired by Charles, Count of Soissons, who gave it its name. He repaired and enlarged it, and it took the name of Hôtel de Soissons. He died in 1612 and his widow, Anne de Montafié, Countess of Clermont-en-Beauvaisis, continued acquiring numerous properties around the hotel until her death in 1644. The Hôtel de Soissons was then in its final form. It passed to her daughter, Marie de Bourbon (1606–1692), wife of Thomas Francis, Prince of Carignano (1596–1656). Their son Emmanuel Philibert, Prince of Carignano (1628–1709), inherited the property, and passed it to his successor Victor Amadeus I, Prince of Carignano (1690–1741), in 1718.

In 1720 Victor Amadeus established the Paris Bourse in his gardens. Buildings were erected in front of the hotel to accommodate speculators and negotiators. Victor Amadeus was bankrupted and forced to sell the property in 1740. The provost of Paris bought the land and destroyed the building in 1748. The materials were sold to pay the creditors. The column, sold separately, was acquired by Louis Petit de Bachaumont, who then donated it to the City of Paris. The column is all that remains of the Hôtel de la Reine today. It can be seen next to the domed Bourse de commerce. Catherine's biographer Leonie Frieda has called it "a poignant reminder of the fleeting nature of power".

Between 1763 and 1767 the City of Paris built a circular building on the site for the storage and sale of wheat. The Halle aux blés (Corn Exchange) was designed by Nicolas Le Camus de Mézières with a circular central courtyard and a double staircase. The layout of that building has been retained.

== Sources ==
- "Bourse de Commerce". Structurae (in French).
- Frieda, Leonie (2005). Catherine de Medici. London: Phoenix. ISBN 0-7538-2039-0.
- Hillairet, Jacques (1978). "Connaissance du Vieux Paris" (in French). Editions de Minuit.
- Knecht, R. J. (1998). Catherine de' Medici. London and New York: Longman. ISBN 0-582-08241-2.
- Thomson, David (1984). Renaissance Paris: Architecture and Growth, 1475-1600. Berkeley: University of California Press. ISBN 0-520-05347-8.
