= Jean Bullant =

French architect and sculptor

- Born: 1515
- Died: 1578 (aged 62–63)
- Occupation: Architect

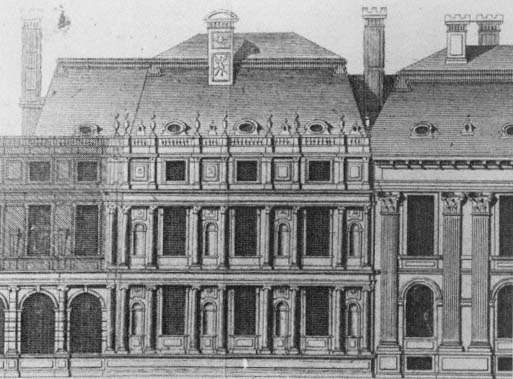
Bullant pavilion at the Tuileries

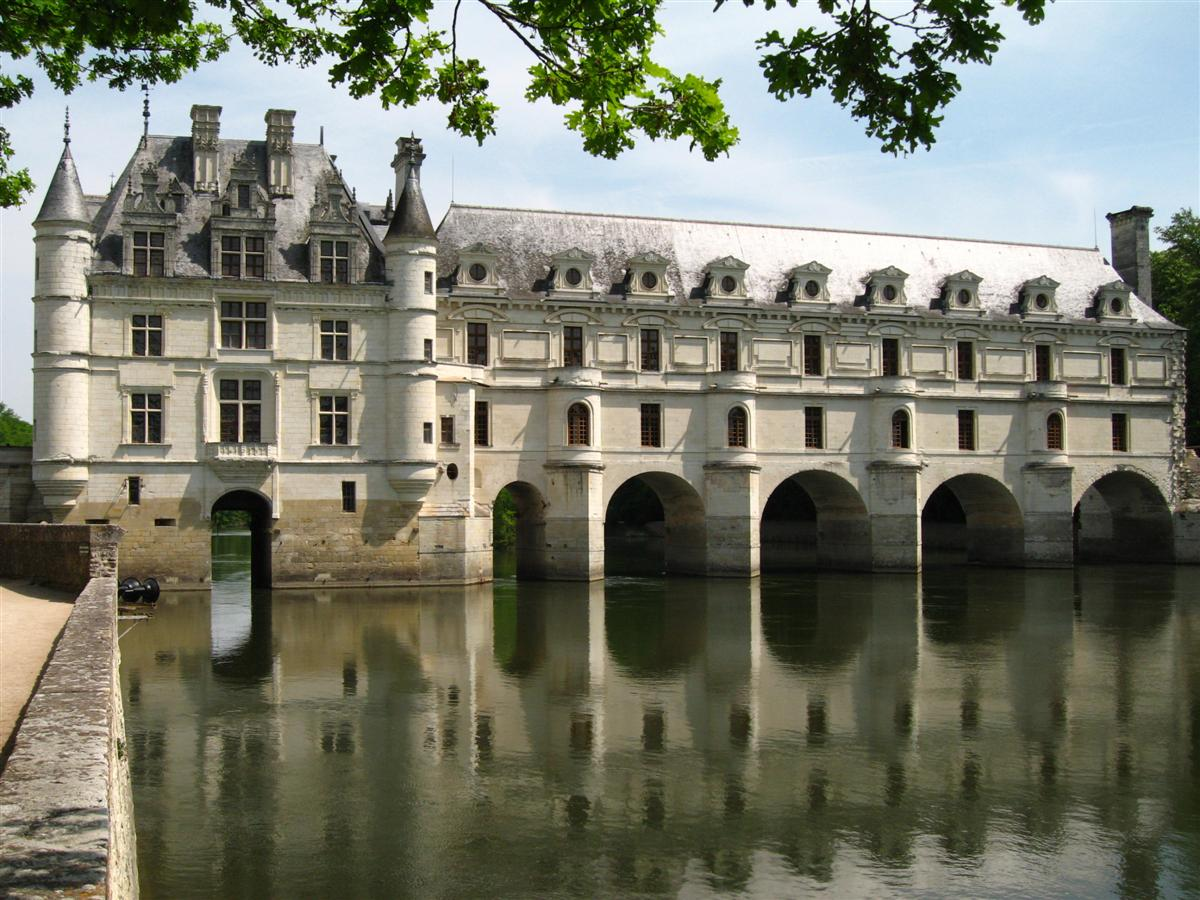
Bullant's Galerie over Philibert Delorme's bridge at Chenonceaux

Jean Bullant (French pronunciation: [ʒɑ̃ bylɑ̃]; 1515 – 13 October 1578) was a French architect and sculptor who built the tombs of Anne de Montmorency, Grand Connétable of France, Henri II, and Catherine de' Medici. He also worked on the Tuileries, the Louvre, and the Château d'Écouen. Bullant was a Huguenot.

== Career ==
On his return in 1537 from a study in Rome, Bullant worked for Montmorency, for whom he transformed the Château d'Écouen about 1550, built the "petit château" at Chantilly, and modernized the Château de Fère-en-Tardenois, with its splendid bridge.

He took up the ongoing works at the Tuileries upon the death of Philibert Delorme (1570), and was appointed a royal architect, (1571–78). At Chenonceaux he built the gallery that spans the river on arches (1576–1577). For Catherine de Médicis he built the Hôtel de Soissons, (1572–84; demolished in 1748), of which only the Medici's column remains.

His treatise on architecture, La Règle générale architecture sur Les cinq manières de colonnes, was published at Paris, 1564 and 1568. Bullant was also the author of treatises linking theory to practice, on geometry for craftsmen (Petit Traicté de géometrie et horologiography pratique, 1564), and horology, notably quadrants and solar clocks (Recueil d'Horlogiographie, 1561).

== See also ==
- Catherine de' Medici's building projects

== Additional sources ==
- Blunt, Anthony. Art and Architecture in France, 1500-1700 2nd ed. Harmondsworth: Penguin, 1970.
- Charles Bauchal Nouveau dictionnaire des architectes français. Paris: André, Daly fils et Cie, 1887; p. 842
- F. Lemerle & Y. Pauwels, L'architecture à la Renaissance, Paris: Flammarion, Paris, 1998 (reissued 2004)
