= Parc Monceau =

Urban park in Paris, France

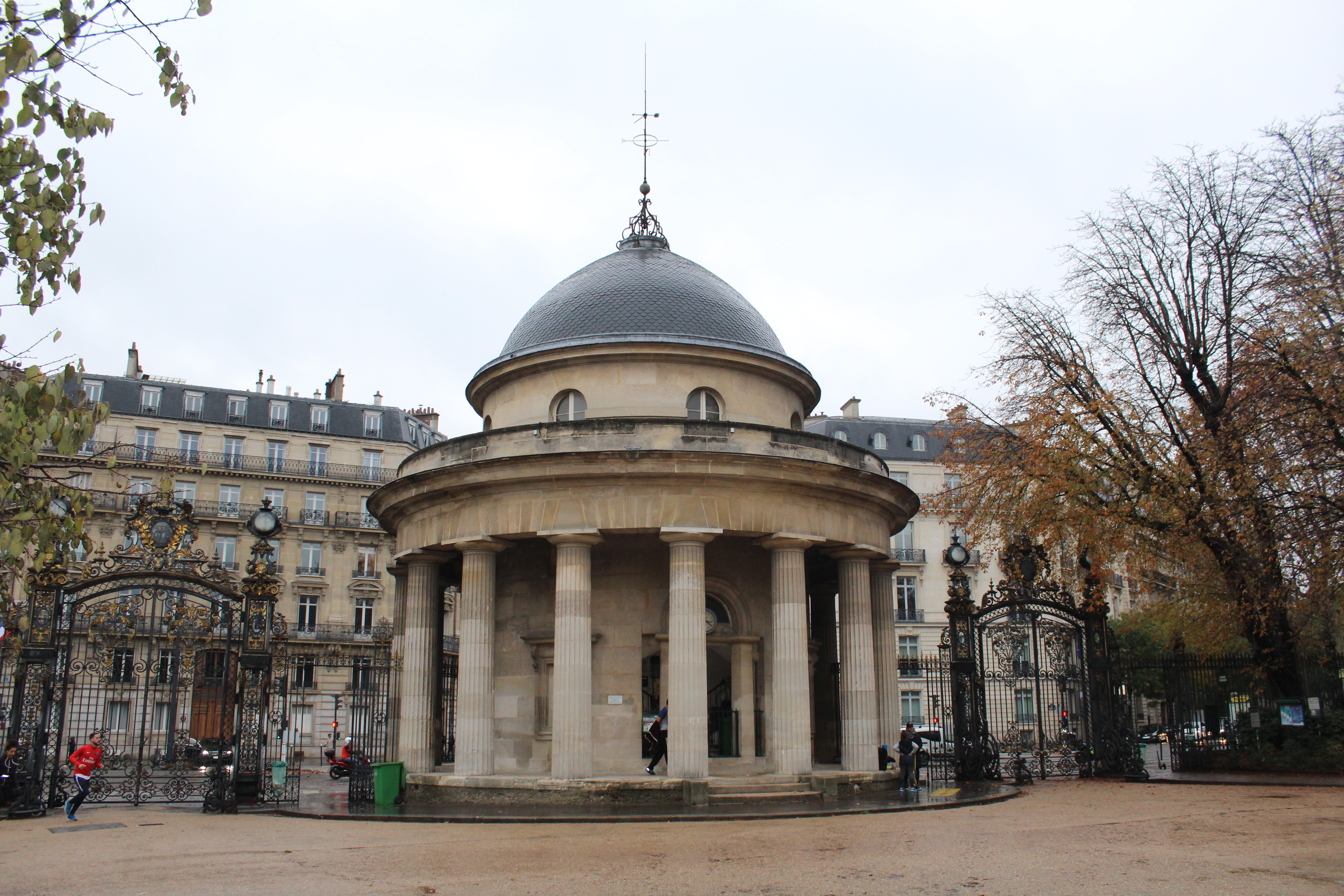
- Rotunda, in Parc Monceau (1787), built as part of the Wall of the Farmers-General
- Interactive map of Parc Monceau
- Type: Urban park
- Location: 8th arrondissement, Paris
- Coordinates: 48°52′47″N 2°18′32″E
- Area: 8.2 hectares (20 acres)
- Created: August 1881
- Status: Open all year
- Public transit: Located near the Métro station Monceau

Parc Monceau (French pronunciation: [paʁk mɔ̃so]; lit. 'Monceau Park') is a public park situated in the 8th arrondissement of Paris, France, at the junction of the Boulevard de Courcelles, Rue de Prony and Rue Georges Berger. At the main entrance is a rotunda. The park covers an area of 8.2 hectares (20 acres).

== History ==
=== The Folly of the Duke of Chartres ===
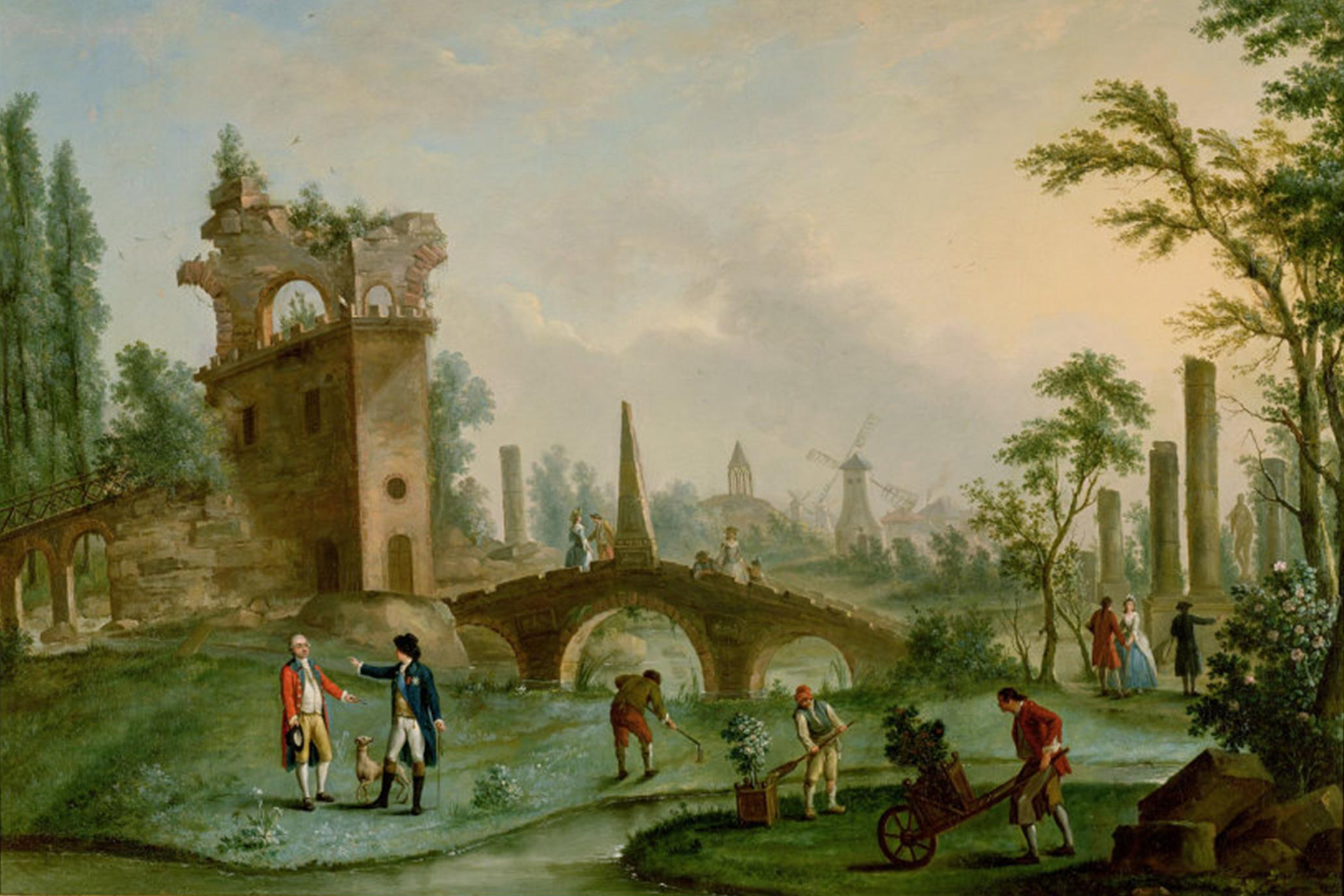
Carmontelle giving keys to Parc Monceau to the Duke of Chartres (painting by Carmontelle (1779)

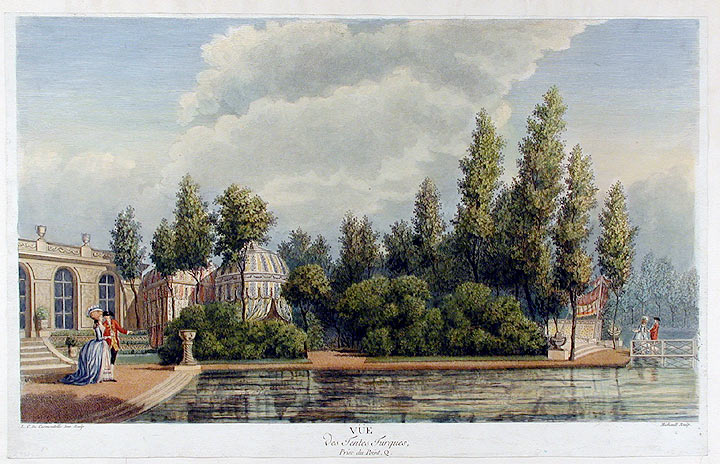
Turkish tents and lake in Parc Monceau painted by Carmontelle (1779)

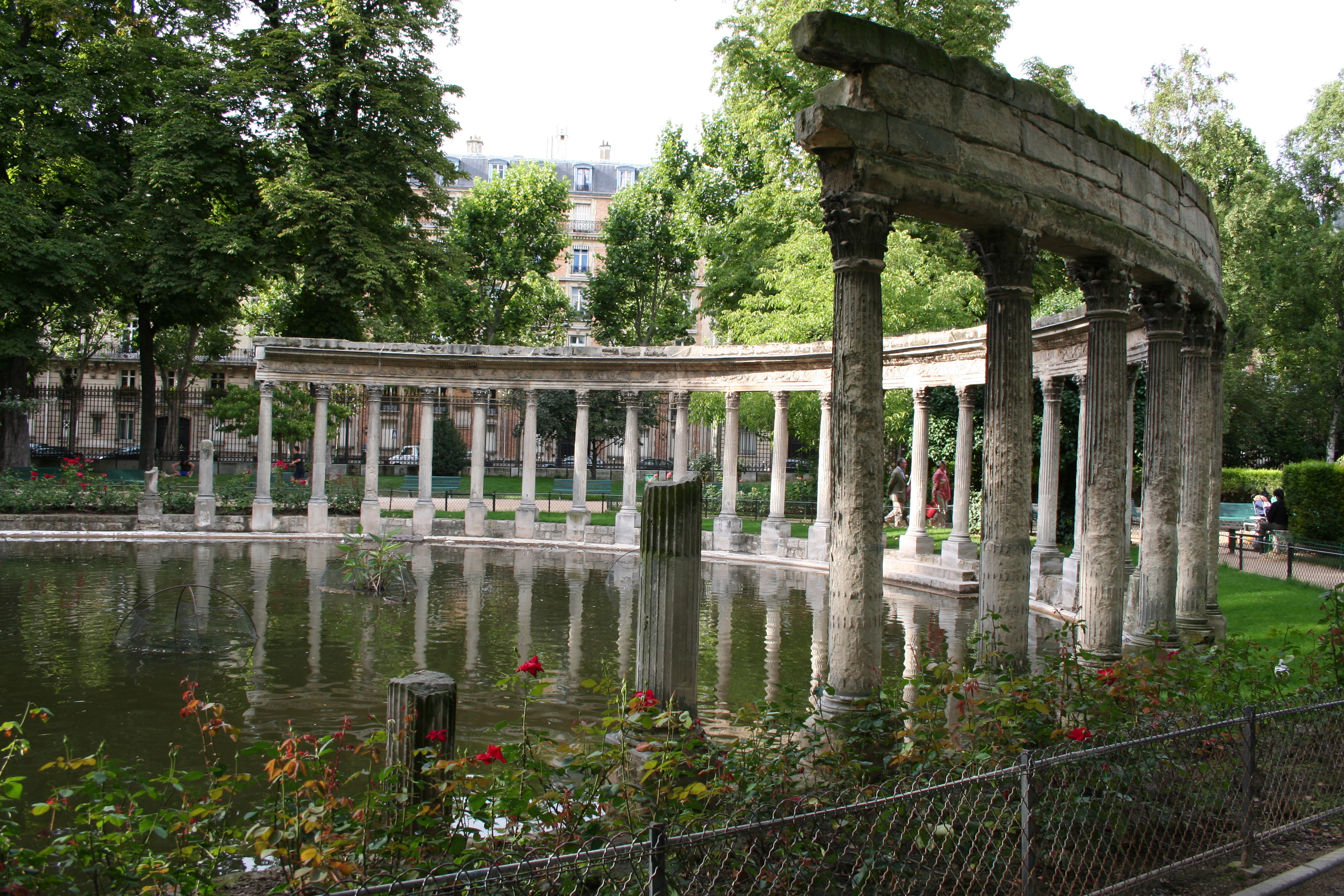
The classical colonnade in Parc Monceau (1778)

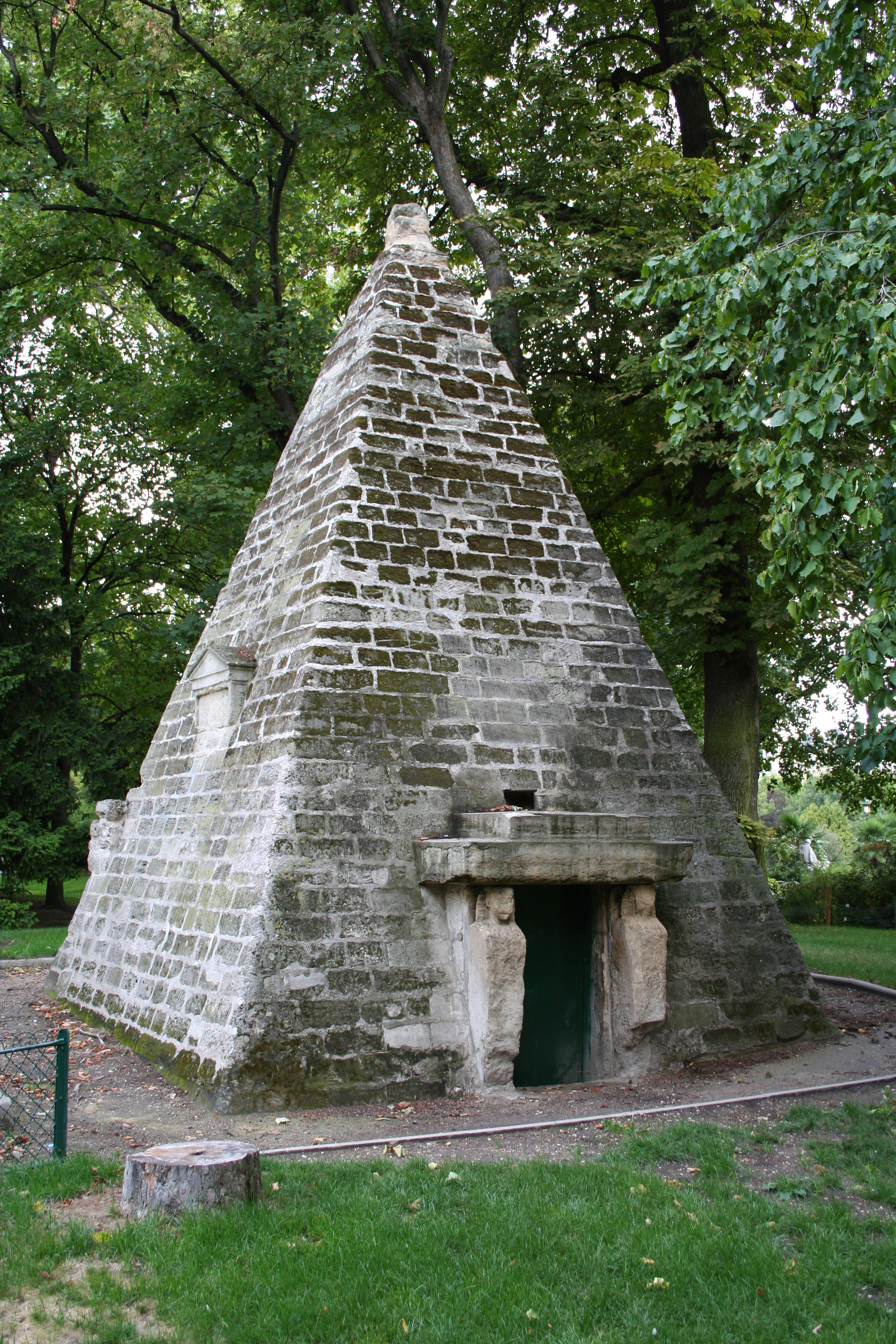
The Egyptian Pyramid (1778) in Parc Monceau

The park was established by Phillippe d'Orléans, Duke of Chartres, a cousin of King Louis XVI, fabulously wealthy, and active in court politics and society. In 1769 he had begun purchasing the land where the park is located. In 1778, he decided to create a public park, and employed the writer and painter Louis Carrogis Carmontelle to design the gardens.

The Duke was a close friend of the Prince of Wales, later George IV, and an anglophile. His intention was to create what was then called an Anglo-Chinese or English garden, on the earlier model of Stowe House in England (1730–1738), with its examples of the architectural folly, or fantastic reconstructions of buildings of different ages and continents. It was similar in style to several other examples of the French landscape garden built at about the same time, including the Desert de Retz, the gardens of the Château de Bagatelle and the Folie Saint James.

Carmontelle employed a German landscape architect named Etickhausen and the architect of the Duke, Bernard Poyet, to build the follies. The intention of the garden was to surprise and amaze visitors. This goal was clearly stated by Carmontelle: "It is not necessary for gardens or nature to be presented in the most agreeable forms. It's necessary instead to preserve the charm that one encounters entering the garden, and to renew it with each step, so that the visitor in his soul will have the desire to revisit the garden every day and to possess it for himself. The true art is to know how to keep the visitors there, through a variety of objects, otherwise they will go to the real countryside to find what should be found in this garden; the image of liberty.".

The garden designed by Carmontelle was finished in 1779. It contained a miniature ancient Egyptian pyramid, a Roman colonnade, antique statues, a pond of water lilies, a tatar tent, a farmhouse, a Dutch windmill, a temple of Mars, a minaret, an Italian vineyard, an enchanted grotto, and "a gothic building serving as a chemistry laboratory," as described by Carmontelle. In addition to the follies, the garden featured servants dressed in oriental and other exotic costumes, and unusual animals, such as camels.

Though the Folly was (and is) frequently described as an Anglo-Chinese or English garden, its architect, Carmontelle, had a very different view. In his work, Jardin de Monceau, près de Paris (1779), he wrote: "It was not at all an English garden that was intended at Monceau, but precisely what the critics said; to put together into one garden all times and all places. It is simply a fantasy, to have an extraordinary garden, a pure amusement, and not at all the desire to mimic a nation which, when it makes a "natural" garden, uses a roller on all the greens and spoils nature."

As garden fashions changed, in 1781 parts of the park were remodeled into a more traditional English landscape style by the Scottish landscape gardener Thomas Blaikie. In 1787, a new city wall, the Wall of the Farmers-General, was built along the northern edge of the garden, along with a circular rotunda in the form of a classical Doric temple, known as the Pavilion de Chartres, designed by Claude Nicolas Ledoux. The ground floor of the temple was used as a customs house, while the upper floor was an apartment with a view of the garden reserved for the Duke.

While The Duke was a supporter of the ideas of the French Revolution, and even voted, as a member of the Assembly, for the execution of his own cousin, Louis XVI, it did not save him. He was guillotined during the Reign of Terror in 1793, and the park was nationalized.

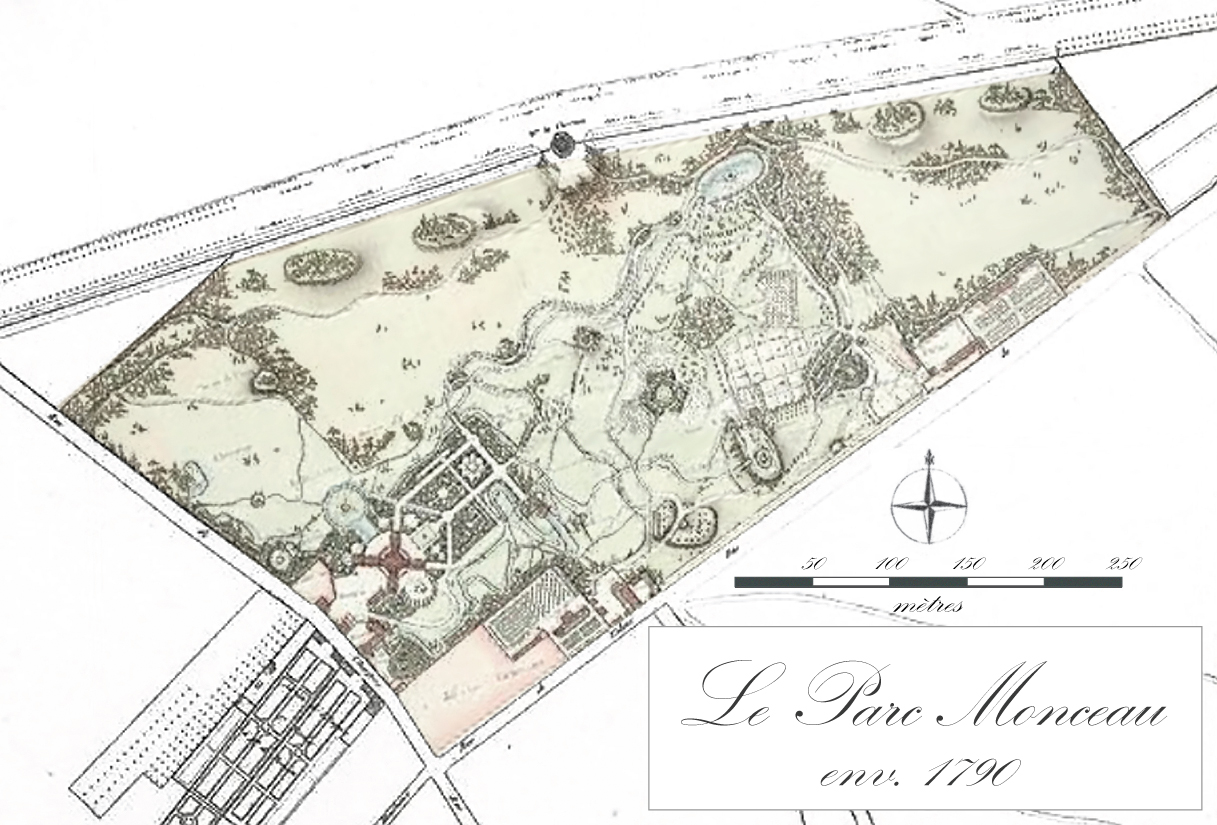

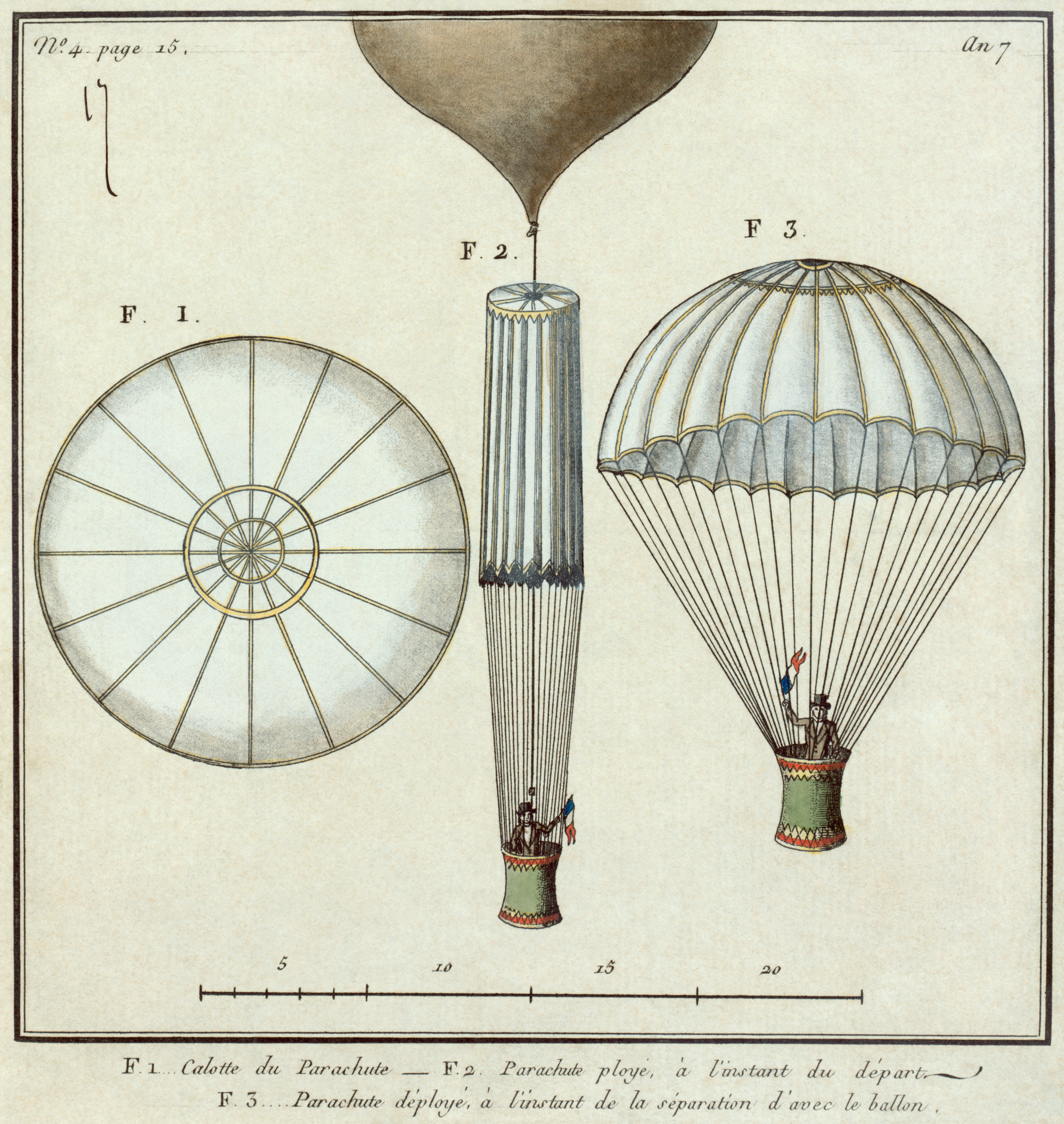
Schematic depiction of André-Jacques Garnerin's parachute used in the Parc Monceau descent of 22 October 1797. Illustration dates from the early nineteenth century.

In 1797, Parc Monceau was the site of the first silk parachute jump, when André-Jacques Garnerin jumped from a Montgolfier hot air balloon, landing in the park where a large crowd was gathered.

=== The Park of Baron Haussmann ===
After the monarchy was restored, the park was returned to the family of the Duke. During the Second Empire, the family sold lots within the park to real estate developers, who built luxurious town houses, reducing the size of the park by half. The remaining part of the park was purchased by the city of Paris in 1860. All that remained of the original folly was the water lily pond, the stream and the fantasy "tombs", including the Egyptian pyramid.

In 1860, the park was purchased by the city, and in August 1861 Parc Monceau became the first new public park in Paris to be created by Baron Haussmann as part of the grand transformation of Paris begun by Emperor Napoleon III. Two main alleys were laid out from east to west and north to south, meeting in the center of the park, and the alleys within the park were widened and paved, so carriages could drive in the park. An ornamental gate 8.3 m (27 ft) high was installed along a newly created avenue, boulevard Malesherbes, curving paths were laid out around the park for strolling. The pavillon de Chartres was also modified by the architect, Gabriel Davioud, who had a graceful classical dome added to the structure. He also built a bridge modeled after the Rialto bridge in Venice over the stream to replace the Chinese bridge by Carmontelle that had once been there. He preserved the other follies remaining from the original garden. Haussmann embellished the park with a rich collection of exotic trees and flowers from around the world.

In 1871, following the downfall of Napoleon III, and the subsequent uprising and then crushing of the Paris Commune, the park was the site of a massacre of Communards by army troops.

Claude Monet painted a series of three paintings of the park in the spring of 1876. He painted three further paintings of the park in 1878. Hector Berlioz was also fond of the park.

During the Third Republic, Parc Monceau was decorated with many statues of writers and musicians; notably a statue of Maupassant by Raoul Verlet (1897); Pailleron by Leopold Bernstamm (1906); Musset by Antonin Mercié (1906), a statue which had originally stood in the square of the Théâtre-Français; Gounod, also by Antonin Mercié (1902); Ambroise Thomas by Alexandre Falguière (1900); and Chopin by Froment-Meurice (1906). An arcade of the old Paris Hotel de Ville, burned by the Communards in 1871, was placed near the colonnade of Carmontelle.

== Features ==
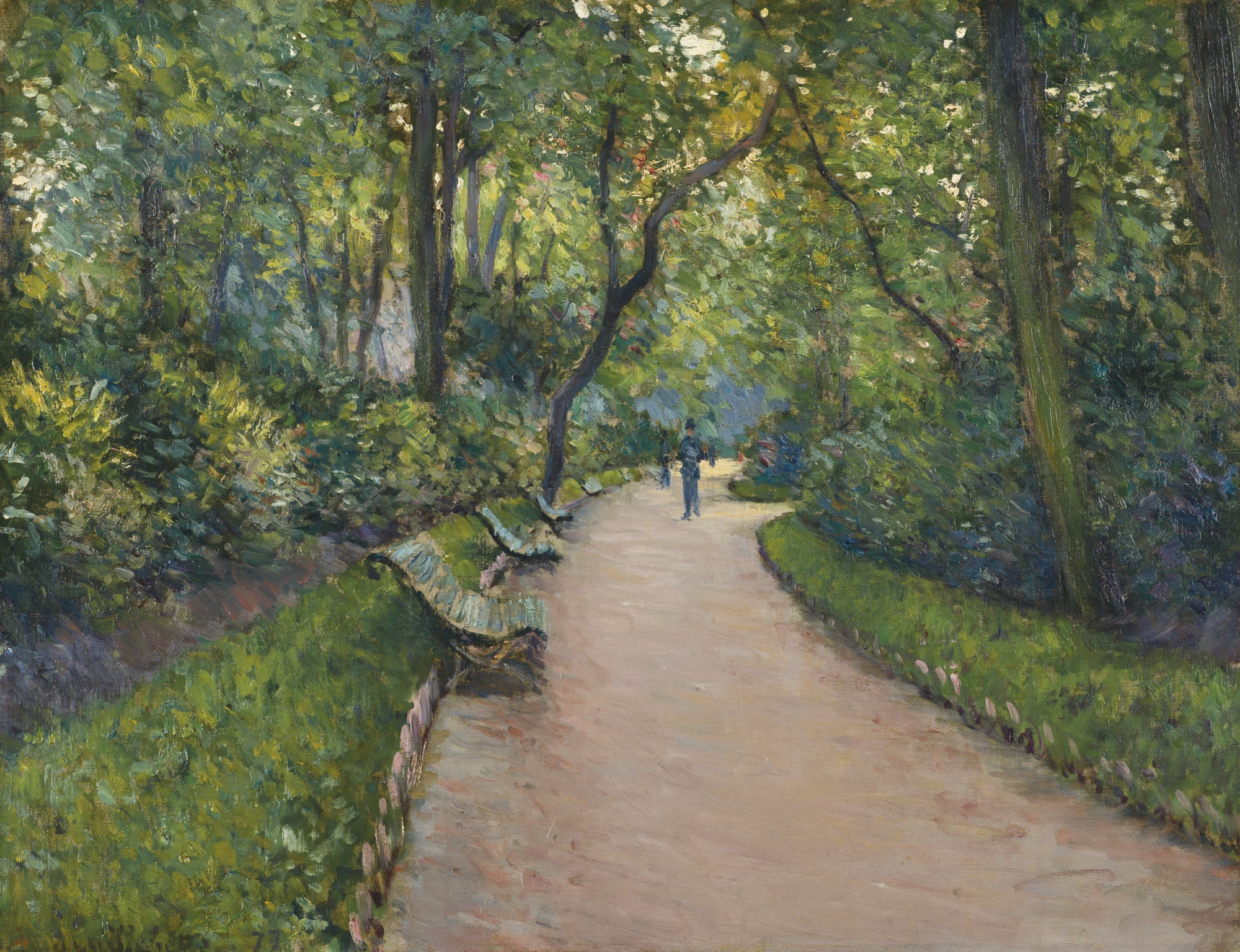
Gustave Caillebotte (1848-1894), Le Parc Monceau, oil on canvas, 1877

The park is unusual in France due to its "English" style: its informal layout, curved walkways and randomly placed statues distinguish it from the more traditional, French-style garden. It includes a collection of scaled-down architectural features, or follies — including an Egyptian pyramid, a Chinese fort, a Dutch windmill, and Corinthian pillars. A number of these are masonic references, reflecting the fact that Philippe d'Orléans was a leading freemason. Parc Monceau includes statues of famous French figures including Guy de Maupassant, Frédéric Chopin, Charles Gounod, Ambroise Thomas, Alfred de Musset, and Edouard Pailleron.

Today, the park has play areas for children and remains very popular with local residents and their families. The site is an active free Wi-Fi area, for computer users looking for Internet access.

Parc Monceau is open daily from sunrise to sunset, with extended hours in the summer months. There are nine gated entries that are monitored by a fifth-generation park watchman who lives above the royal rotunda at the north entrance. The park is listed as grade II semi-private and the six private residences located directly on the park have twenty-four-hour access to the grounds.

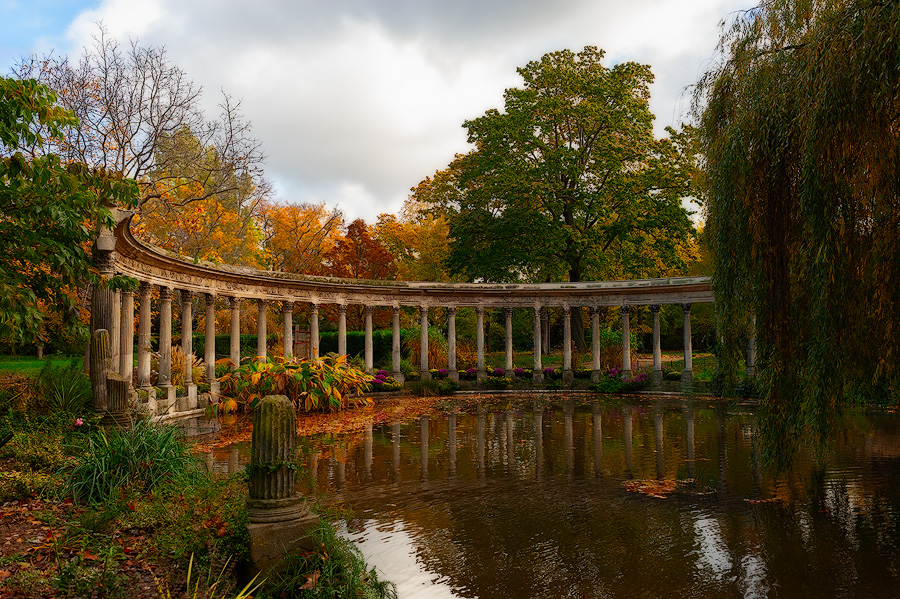
Columns in Monceau Park

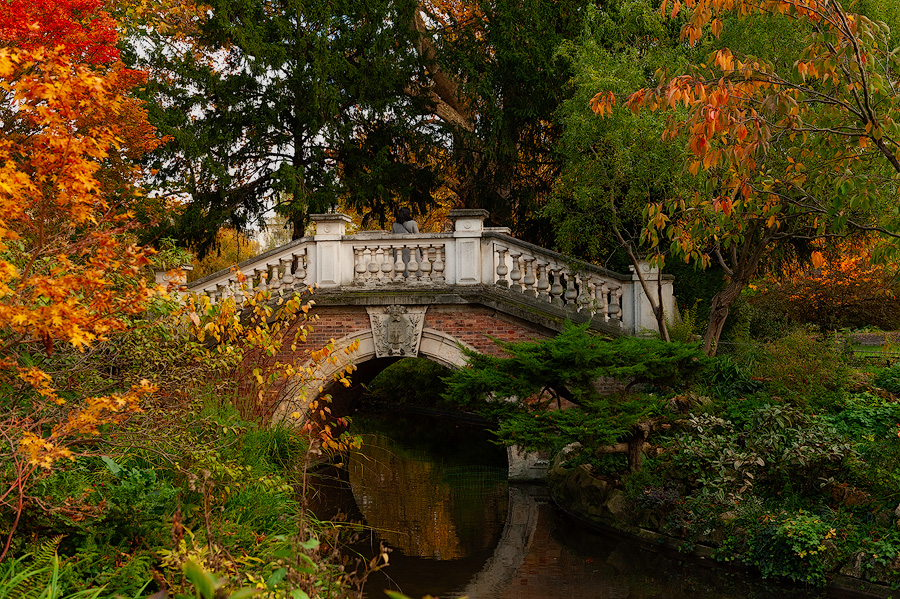
Bridge in Parc Monceau

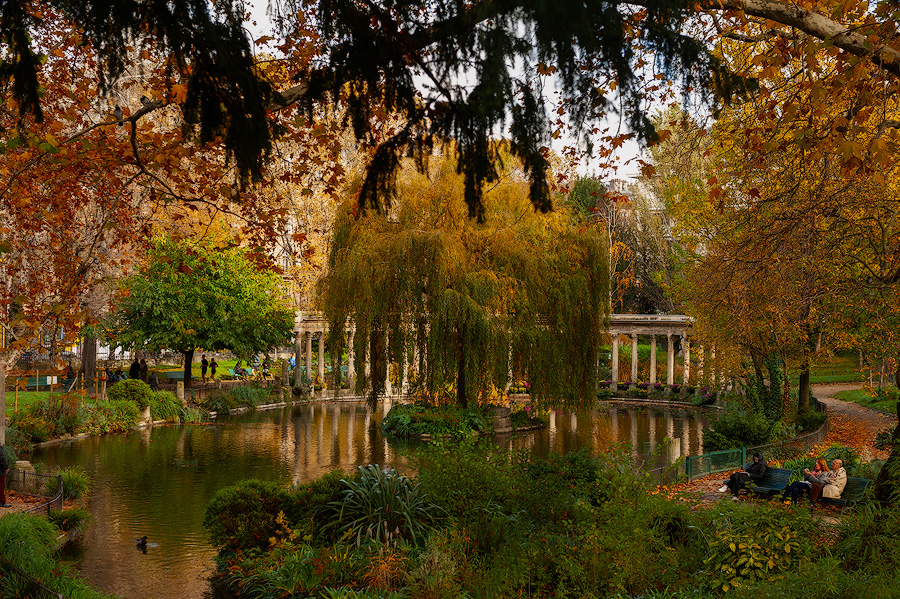
Columns at the lake in Monceau Park

== Access ==
The entrance to Paris Métro station Monceau is located at the park's main entrance on Boulevard de Courcelles.

== See also ==
- List of parks and gardens in Paris
- Musée Cernuschi, located nearby
- Listing of the works of Alexandre Falguière
- The works of Antonin Mercié

== Works cited ==
- Jarrassé, Dominique (2007). Grammaire des jardins parisiens : De l'héritage des rois aux créations contemporaines (in French). Parigramme. ISBN 978-2-84096-476-6.
