= French landscape garden =

Style of garden

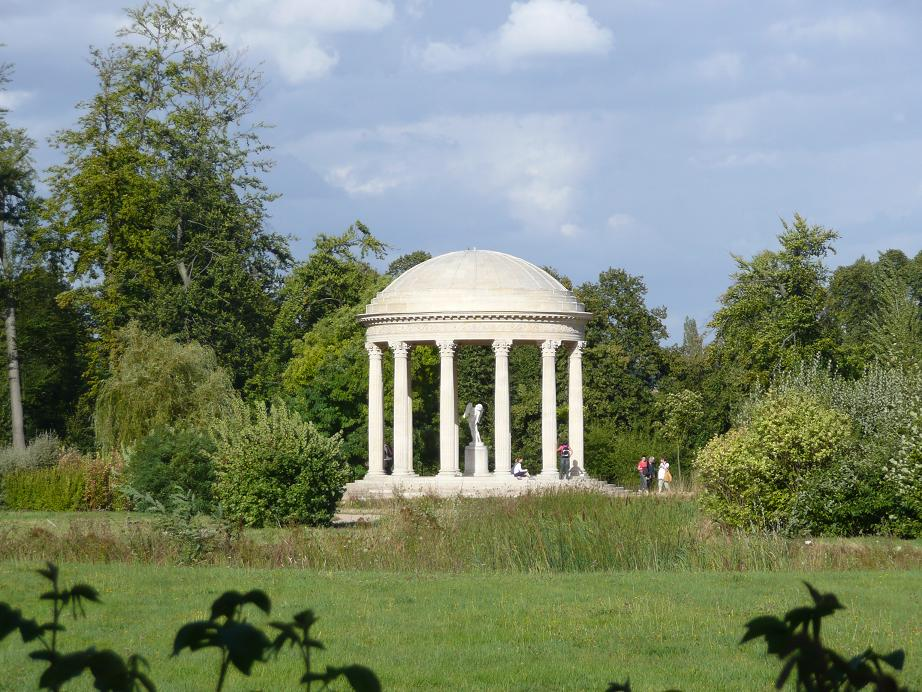
Temple de l'Amour created for Marie Antoinette and the Jardin de la Reine at Versailles

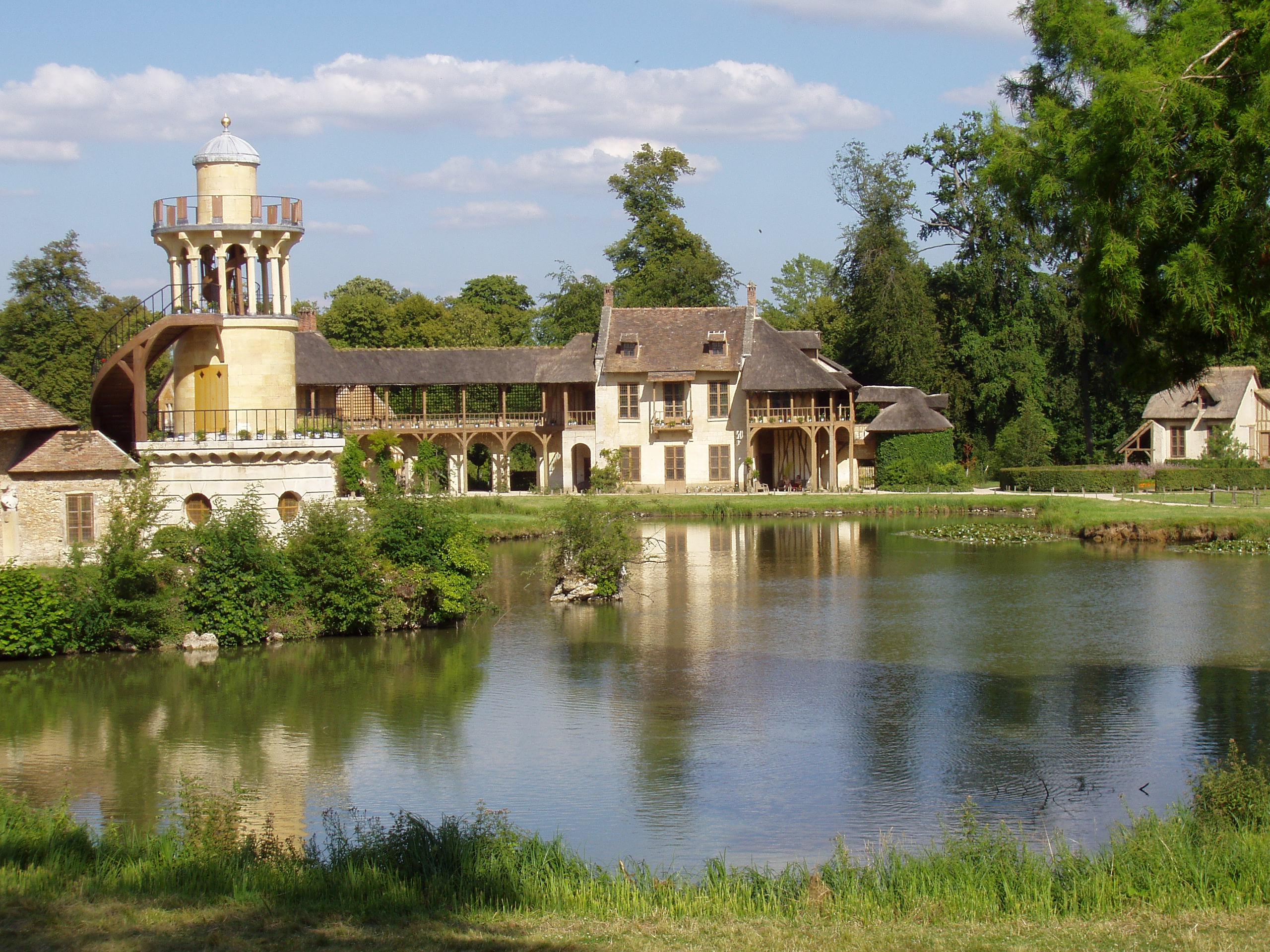
Marie Antoinette's idyllic Hameau de la Reine at Versailles

The French landscape garden (French: jardin anglais, jardin à l'anglaise, jardin paysager, jardin pittoresque, jardin anglo-chinois) is a style of garden inspired by idealized romantic landscapes and the paintings of Hubert Robert, Claude Lorrain and Nicolas Poussin, European ideas about Chinese gardens, and the philosophy of Jean-Jacques Rousseau. The style originated in England as the English landscape garden in the early 18th century, and spread to France where, in the second half of the 18th century and early 19th century, it gradually replaced the rigidly clipped and geometrical French formal garden (jardin à la française).

== The decline of the jardin à la française ==
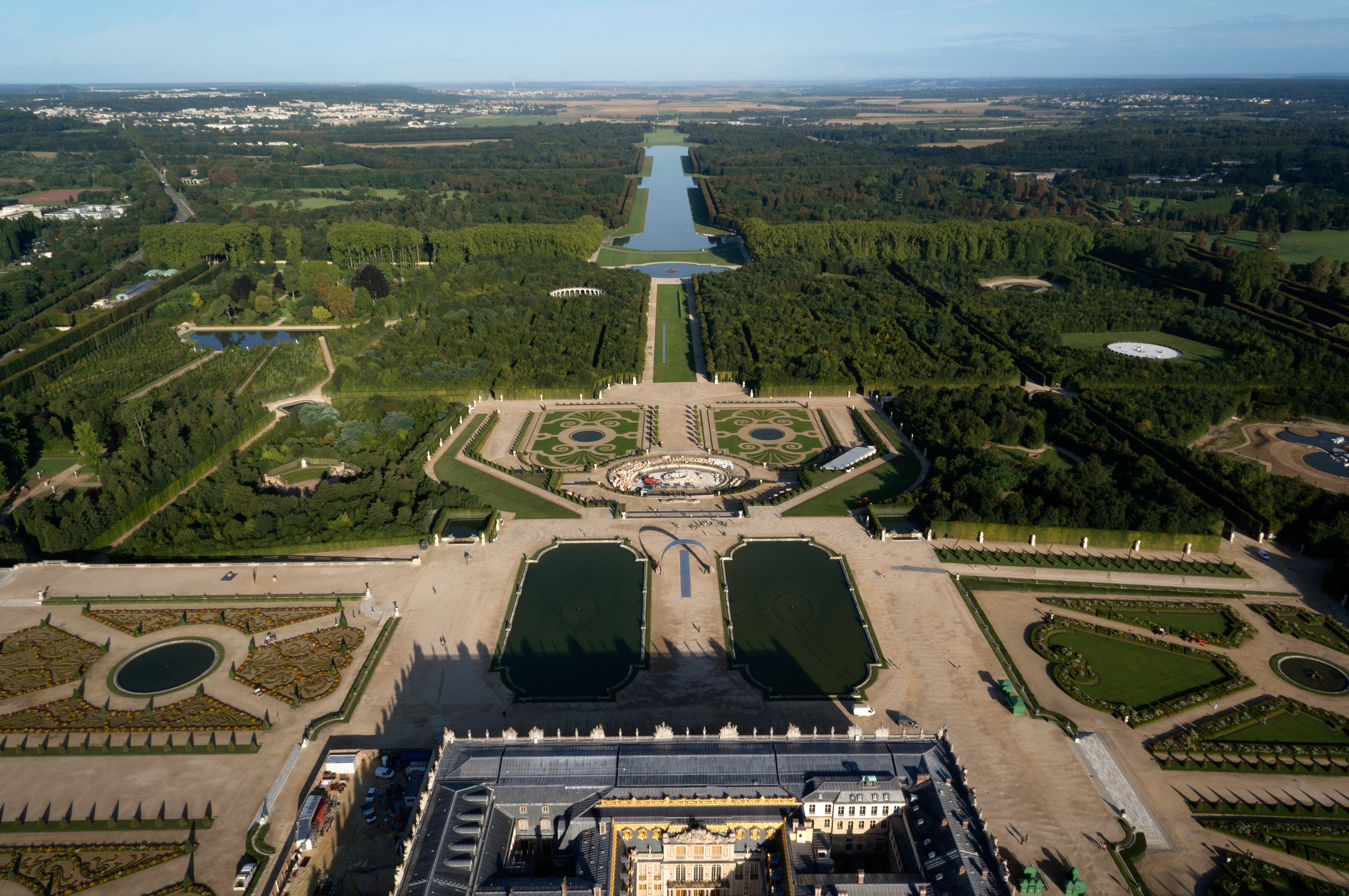
The gardens of Versailles

Even during the lifetime of Louis XIV and his gardens of Versailles, the formal, symmetrical jardin à la française was criticized by writers La Fontaine, Madame de Sévigné, Fénelon and Saint-Simon for imposing tyranny over nature; demonstrating human mastery over nature was indeed part of its intention. In 1709, in his influential book on garden design, Dezallier d'Argenville called for garden designers to pay more attention to nature than to art, though still suggesting highly formal designs. Signs of a new, more natural style were seen in the design of the bosquet des Sources at the Trianon, created by André Le Nôtre, and in the bosquets of the Château de Marly, created by Hardouin-Mansart. After the military defeats of France at the beginning of the 18th century and the freezing winter of 1709, the royal treasury was unable to finance upkeep of the elaborate gardens of Versailles. Trees were untrimmed, gardens and paths were overgrown. France was ready for the introduction of a new style of gardens.

== The influence of the English garden ==
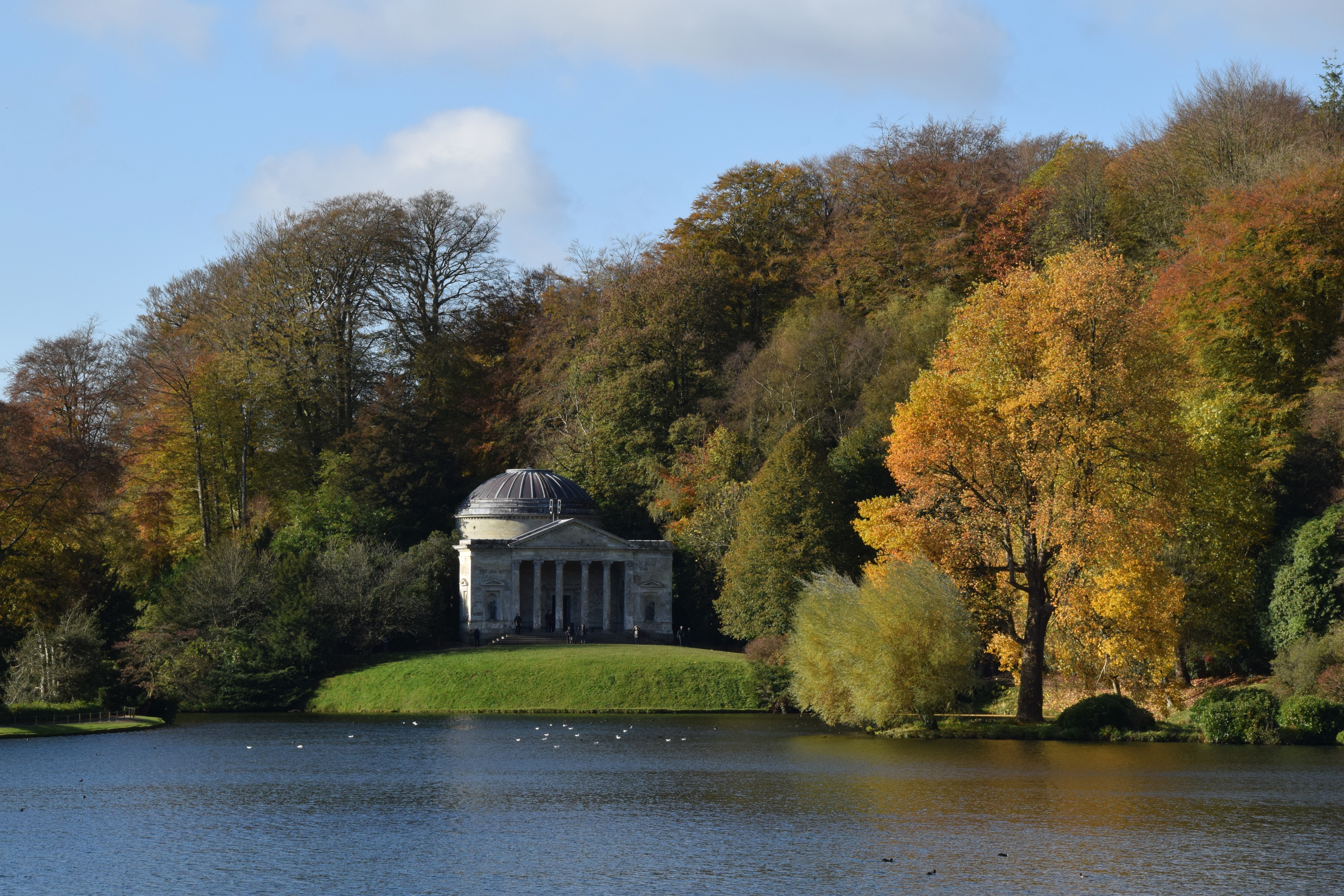
Eyecatching pantheon at Stourhead estate

The French landscape garden was influenced first of all by the new style of English landscape garden, particularly those of William Kent at Stowe (1730–1748) and Rousham (1738–1741), and the garden by Henry Hoare at Stourhead (begun in 1741), which were themselves inspired by trips to Italy and filled with recreations of antique temples. Later, the gardens of Capability Brown, who had studied with William Kent, had an important influence in France, particularly his work at Stowe (1748), Petworth (1752), Chatsworth (1761), Bowood (1763) and Blenheim Palace (1769). Another later influence was the gardens of Horace Walpole at Strawberry Hill (beginning 1750), where Gothic ruins replaced antique temples.

Descriptions of English gardens were first brought to France by the Abbé Le Blanc, who published accounts of his voyage in 1745 and 1751. A treatise on the English garden, Observations on Modern Gardening, written by Thomas Whately and published in London in 1770, was translated into French in 1771. After the end of the Seven Years' War in 1763, French noblemen were able to voyage to England and see the gardens for themselves. During the French Revolution, many French nobles went into exile in England, and brought back with them the new style of gardening.

== The Chinese influence on the French landscape garden ==
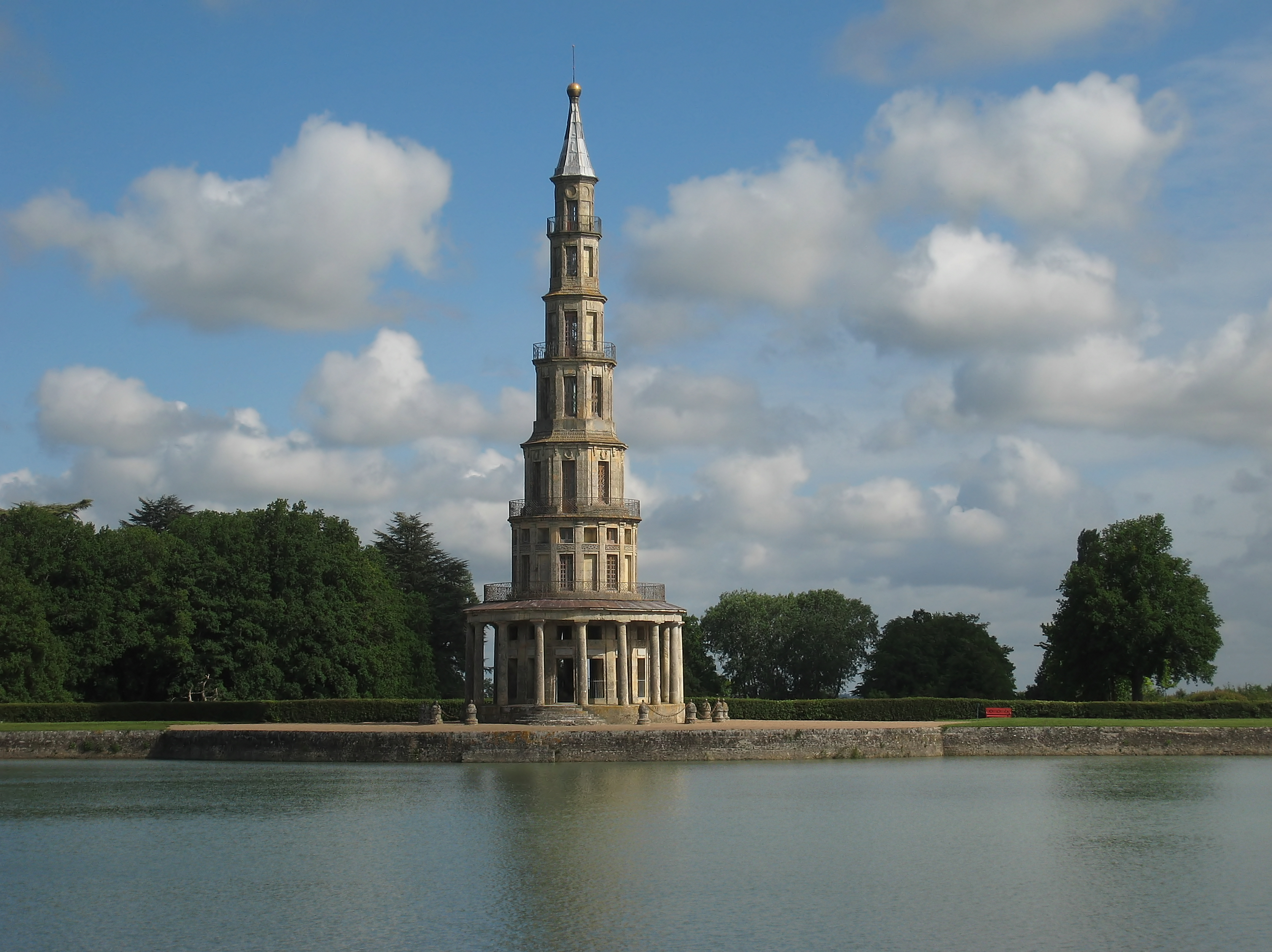
Chinese pagoda in the gardens of Chanteloup

In 1743, Father Attiret, a French Jesuit priest and painter in service to the Emperor of China, wrote a series of letters describing the Chinese gardens he had seen. In particular he described the Emperor's summer residence, Yuanming Yuan near Beijing:

A beautiful disorder reigns almost everywhere. An anti-symmetry. Everything works on this principle: it is a pastoral and natural countryside that one wants to represent: a solitude and not a well-ordered palace following all the rules of symmetry and proportions.

Attiret's letters were a success in both France and in England, where they were translated and published in 1752. They had an important influence on what became known as the Anglo-Chinese garden.

In 1757 Sir William Chambers, an English writer and traveller who made three trips to China, published a book called Designs of Chinese Buildings, Furniture, Dresses, Machines, and Utensils, with a chapter about gardens. The book was quickly translated into French. Chambers brought to Europe the Chinese idea that gardens should be composed of a series of scenes which evoke different emotions, ranging from enchantment to horror to laughter. Chambers wrote, "The enchanted or romanesque scenes abound in the marvellous. They provoke a series of violent or opposing sensations; footpaths leading down to underground passages where mysterious lights reveal strange groupings; winding roads which pass through beautiful forests leading to precipices or melancholy rivers lined with funerary monuments shaded by laurels and willows. The horrible scenes present hanging rocks, cataracts, caverns, dead tree broken by the storm, burnt or shattered by lightning, and buildings in ruins... The scenes of horror are only one act in a theatrical production that usually ends in a soothing extended perspective, simple forms and beautiful colors. The laughing scenes make one forget the enchantment and the horror of the landscapes that one has passed through."

Chambers became the creator of the first Chinese garden in Europe, complete with the Great Pagoda at Kew Gardens, in the southwest of London. Chambers' book and the Chinese garden he created at Kew Gardens brought Chinese gardens into fashion in both England and France. Landscape gardens in France began to include artificial hills, pagodas, and promenades designed to provoke emotions ranging from melancholy to sadness to joy.

== Rousseau's philosophy of the landscape garden ==
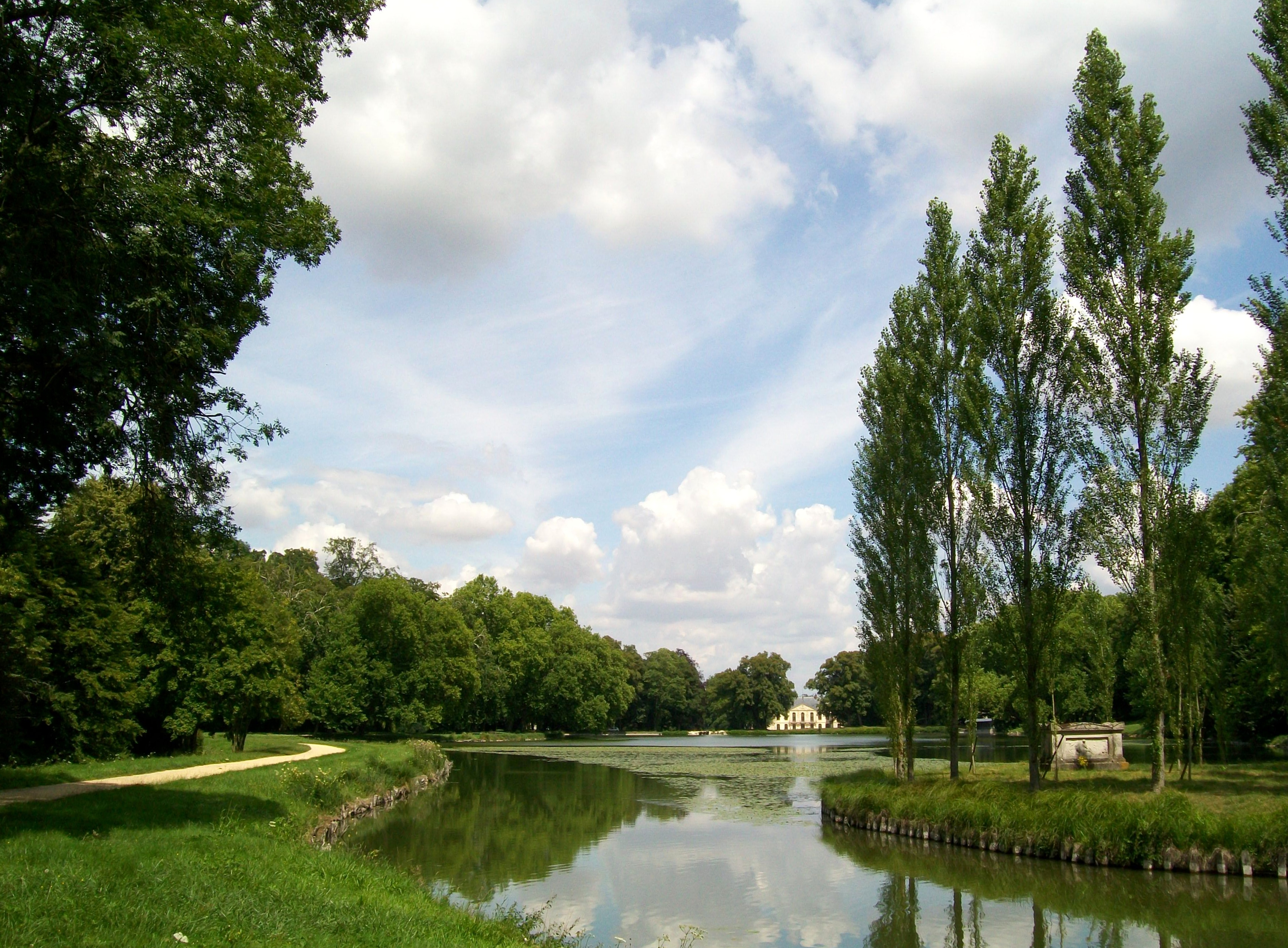
The Parc Jean-Jacques Rousseau at Ermenonville, created 1764–1776 by the Marquis de Vauvray

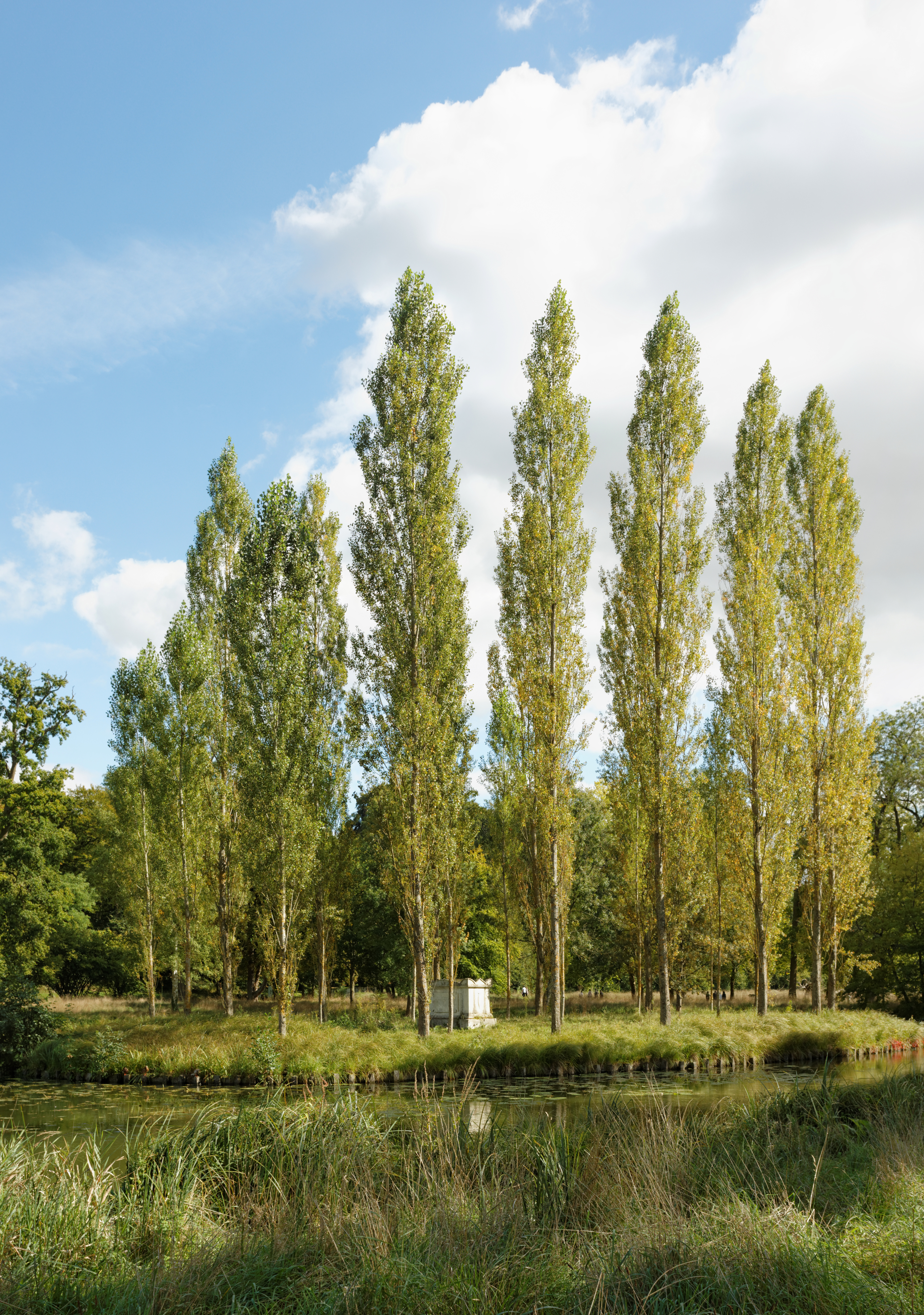
Rousseau's cenotaph on Île des Peupliers, a lake island at Ermenonville

The ideas of the French philosopher Jean-Jacques Rousseau (1712–1778) had a major influence on the landscape garden, and he himself was buried in the first important such garden in France, at Ermenonville. Rousseau wrote in 1762, on the "nobility of nature": "Everything is good when it leaves the hand of the creator"; "Everything degenerates in Man's hands." In his novel Julie ou la Nouvelle Héloïse, Rousseau imagined a perfect landscape, where people could be true to themselves. This imaginary garden became a model for French landscape gardens. The French historian Jurgis wrote: "the theme of this Paradise, once restored by setting free flowers, earth and water, was the guiding principle in the development of landscape gardens. It was a glorification of that which had long been denatured by artifice." In opposing his Elysian Fields, the Orchard at Clarens to the serried trees sculpted into parasols, fans, marmosets, and dragons, Rousseau reawakens this myth with its new liberties.

Rousseau visited England in 1761 and saw the famous gardens, including that at Stowe, but he criticized the mish-mash of different styles there. "It is composed of very beautiful and picturesque places, of which different features have been chosen from different countries," he wrote. "It all seems natural, except the assembly."

René Louis de Girardin, who created the park at Ermenonville, was an avid pupil of Rousseau. He designed the garden to illustrate the idyllic landscapes described in Rousseau's books. He travelled to Paris, was introduced to Rousseau, and persuaded him to visit the garden and stay in a small cottage designed to resemble the house of Julie, called Elysee, described in La Nouvelle Heloise. Rousseau came to visit in May 1778 and revised Les Confessions and continued writing Les Rêveries du promeneur solitaire while staying there; he died there of kidney failure in July 1778. His remains were placed in a tomb in a grove of poplar trees on a small island in the lake. (Note: His remains were later moved to the Panthéon in Paris after the French Revolution.)

Girardin made the park at Ermenonville a living illustration of Rousseau's ideas; making carefully constructed landscapes, like paintings, designed to invite the visitor to take long walks and to feel pure and simple emotions. (Note: Perhaps the best English equivalent would be Capability Brown.) The paths were designed to follow the hillsides, climbing up and down, to give a various view, from shadows of groves of trees to sunlight, and meandering to let the viewer delight the scene from different angles and light. Girardin described the purpose of his garden in a book called De la composition des paysages (1777) ("On the Composition of Landscapes"):

If you wish to have true joy, you must always search for the simplest ways and find amusements which conform to nature, because those pleasures are the only ones that are true and lasting.

The principles taken from Rousseau and transformed into avenues and landscapes by Girardin and other garden designers were copied in landscape gardens around France.

== Painters and the symbolism of the landscape garden ==
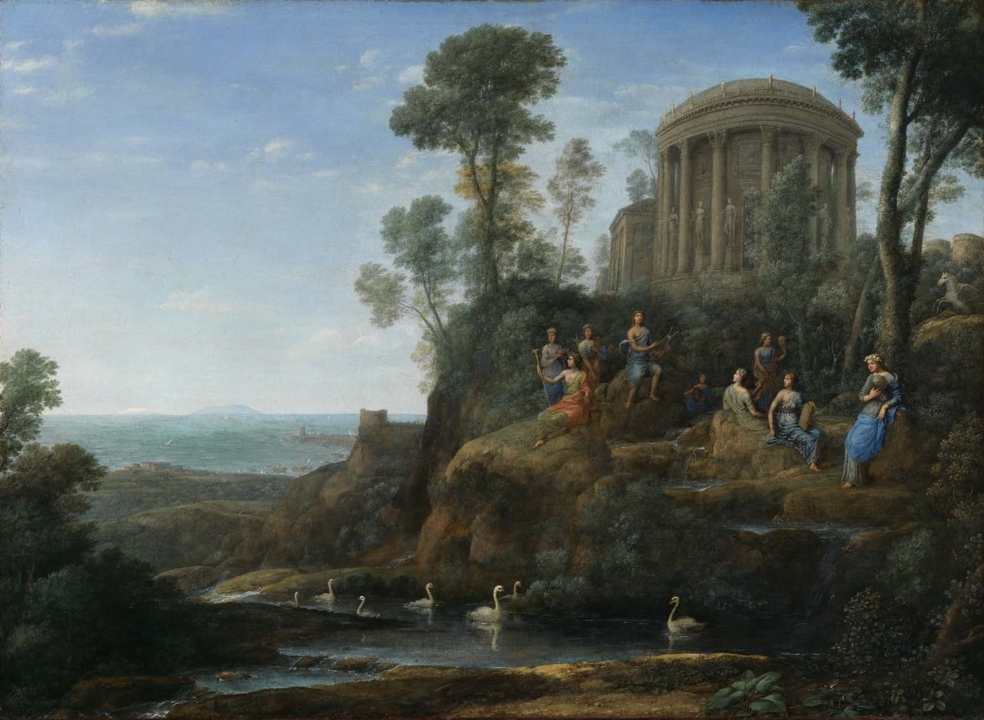
Claude Lorrain's paintings influenced the appearance of the landscape gardens in England and France

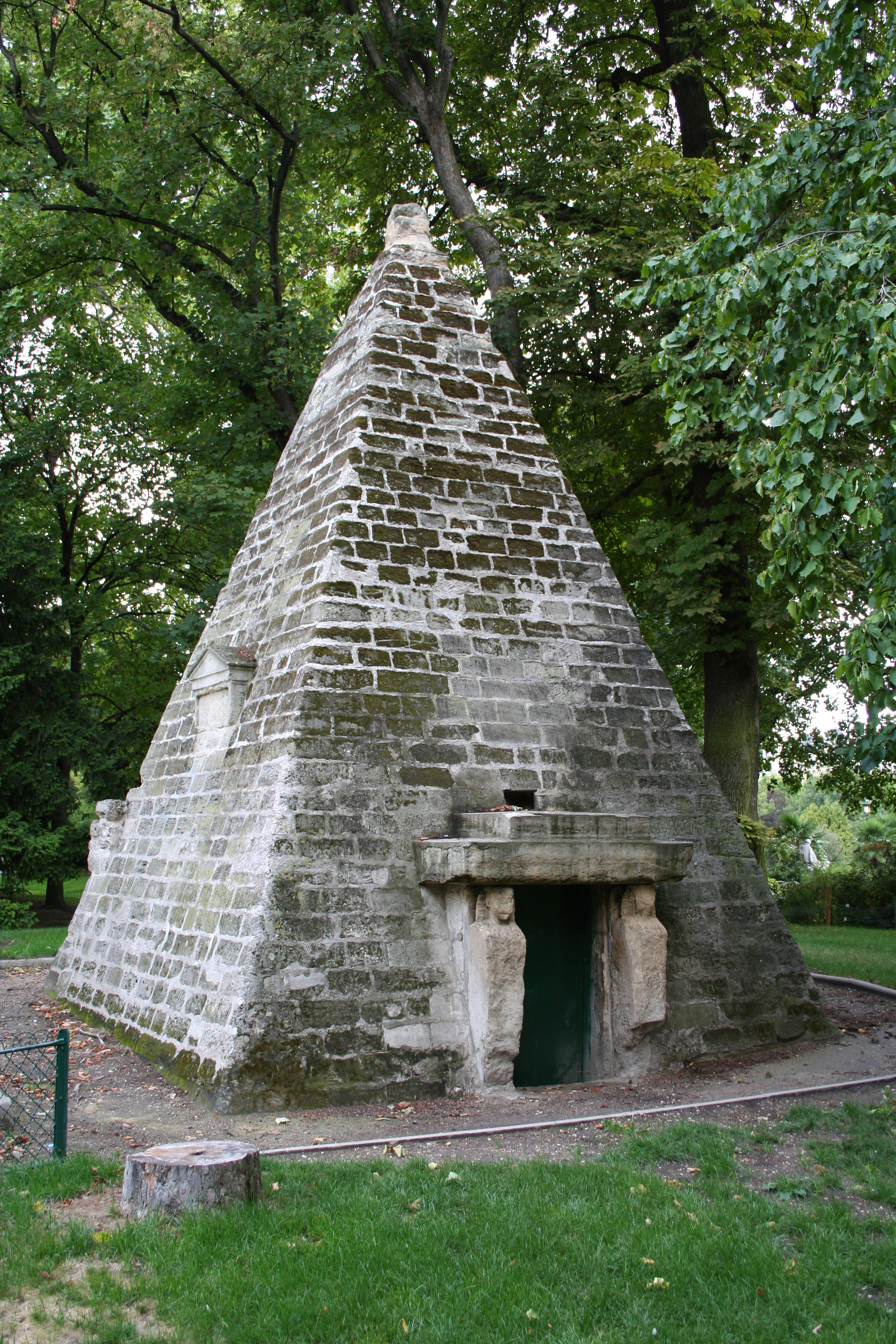
Model of an Egyptian pyramid in Parc Monceau

The views in landscape gardens were rarely copied from real nature; they were more often inspired by romantic paintings, particularly those of Nicolas Poussin, Salvator Rosa and Claude Lorrain, who depicted Arcadian landscapes with mythological scenes. In France they were influenced by the paintings and drawings of Hubert Robert, who depicted romantic scenes of crumbling antique ruins seen during his visits to Italy. Robert himself became a garden designer, contributing to the landscape garden at Betz and the Hameau de la Reine at Versailles.

Landscape gardens were designed to be allegories, taken from literature and painting, and filled with symbols and messages. They were usually either recreations of the Garden of Eden or of the pastoral Arcadia of Roman myths, or they were designed to offer a visual tour of the history of mankind or of all the world. The landscape was not enough – it had to have architecture. The French gardens were filled with fabriques de jardin, imitations of Roman temples, ruins or tombs.

The gardens at Betz, created by the Duc d'Harcourt and the painter Hubert Robert for the Princess of Monaco, were supposed to be a journey around the world. The different parts of the world were represented by an obelisk, a Doric temple, a Chinese kiosk, a Druid temple, and the ruins of a medieval chapel. The gardens of the Château de Bagatelle at Paris contained follies in the form of the temple of the God Pan, the house of the Chinese philosopher, a Pharaoh's tomb, and a hermit's cell. As the architect Louis Carrogis Carmontelle wrote about the garden he created at Monceau, "Let us vary the regions so that we may forget where we are. Let us change the scenes of a garden like the decors at the Opera; let us show what the most able painters can offer as decoration; all periods and all places."

== The influence of explorers and botanists on the French landscape garden ==
The 18th and early 19th century was an age of discovery and enormous activity in the natural sciences, botany and horticulture. Explorers, diplomats and missionaries were instructed to bring new species of plants to France, where they were acclimated in special gardens at the seaports. In 1764 the larch tree was imported from England to France, soon after the cedar of Lebanon. The dahlia and the chrysanthemum, hydrangea and mimosa were imported from Mexico to France. The reverend Charles Plumier (1646–1704) brought back the magnolia, the fuchsia and the begonia from Latin America. Louis Feuilée (1660–1732) brought the calceolaria, oxalis, opuntia and papaya. Pierre Nicholas Le Chéron d'Incarville (1706–1757) introduced Sophora japonica. Bernard de Jussieu (1699–1777) brought the first cedar to be planted in France (1734), while his brother Joseph de Jussieu (1704–1779) introduced heliotrope. The explorers Bougainville (1729–1811) and La Pérouse (1741–1788) brought back numerous plants which made their way into French gardens. Thanks to their discoveries, French landscape gardens were soon ornamented with exotic trees and colorful flowers not seen before in Europe.

== Chronology of notable landscape gardens in France ==
=== The Moulin Joly (1754–1772) ===
The Moulin Joly ("Pretty Mill"), designed by the landscape architect Claude-Henri Watelet, was probably the first garden in France designed in the new style. It was located along the Seine between Colombes and Argenteuil. Watelet discovered the site during a walk, bought it, and created a garden which preserved its natural beauty. It consisted of three islands, with a rustic house, a grotto, shelters for animals, a Chinese bridge, a Dutch bridge and a floating bridge, a mill, and a garden with a traditional layout. Watelet, who called the garden "l'île enchantée", wrote that his garden was "in a pastoral style following the long tradition born in antiquity and carried on by the Italian and French Renaissance." Visitors to the garden included the painters Boucher, Hubert Robert, and Elisabeth Vigée-Lebrun. Marie Antoinette visited several times.

=== Parc Jean-Jacques Rousseau ===
Parc Jean-Jacques Rousseau at Ermenonville was designed by René Louis de Girardin, who spent time as an officer in the army of Louis XV before retiring to his estate. He had visited Italy, Switzerland, Germany and England, and was familiar with the early English landscape gardens. He was particularly inspired by the garden of the British poet William Shenstone, The Leasowes, which became the model for Ermenonville.

In 1776 Girardin published a book, A la composition des paysages (On the Composition of Landscapes), which laid out his theories of gardens, theories that quoted the French translation of a book on gardening by Thomas Whately, and the Théorie des jardins of Jean-Marie Morel (1776).

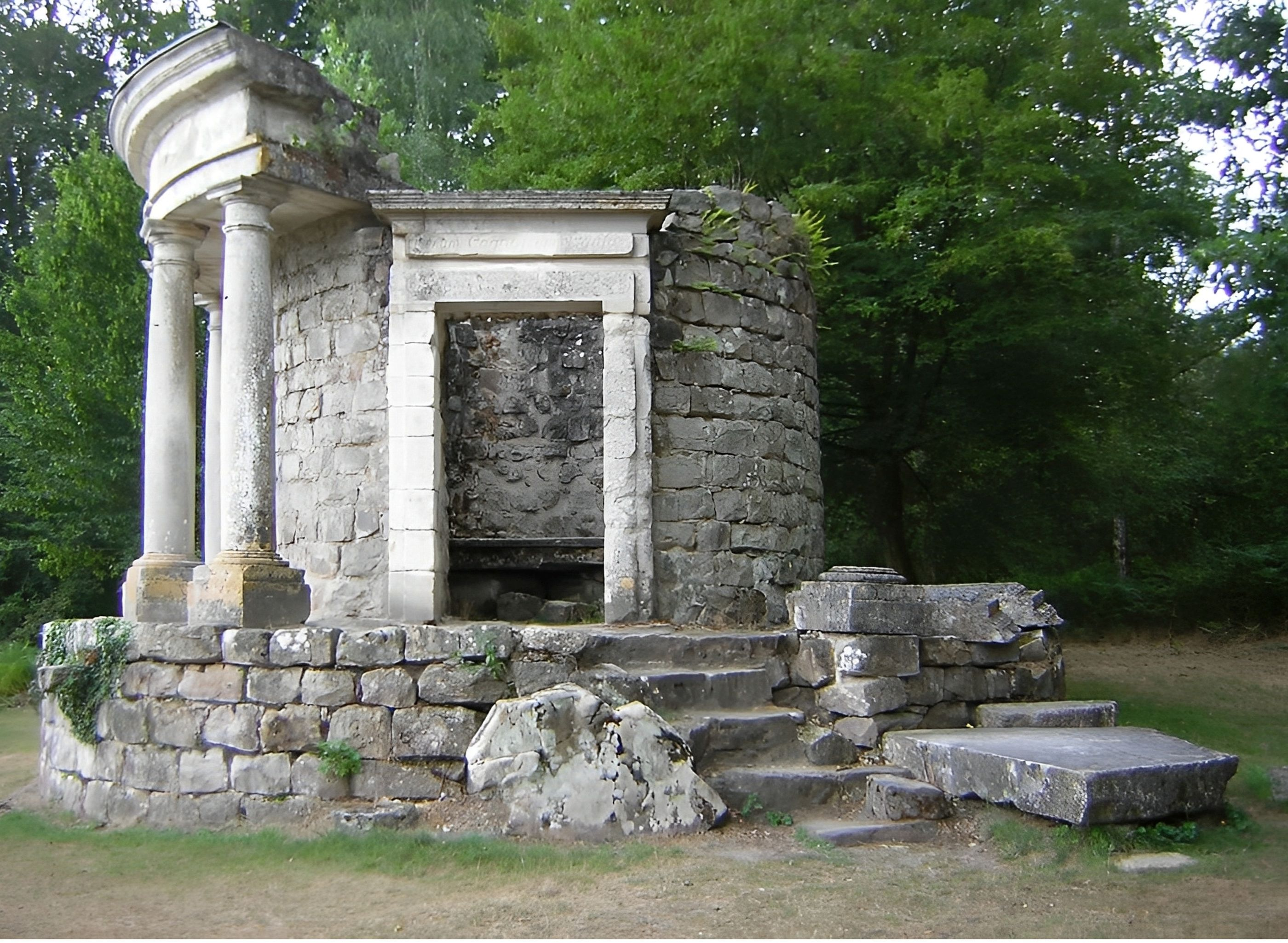
The Temple of Philosophy at Ermenonville

Girardin created the garden at Ermenonville to be a series of tableaux to be seen from various points at different times of day. The artist Hubert Robert contributed drawings for its design. The park occupied 100 hectares (250 acres), lying in a valley along the River Launette. It took ten years to build the garden; ponds needed to be drained and the river had to be diverted. The gardens were ornamented with follies representing a Gothic tower, an obelisk, the Temple of Philosophy (left unfinished to represent the incompleteness of human knowledge), and a hermit's hut.

The 17th-century mansion sat on an island in the middle; northwards was all farmland, and to the west, towards the village, was Le Désert, a wildlife garden. Girardin filled the garden with metaphors representing philosophical Renaissance and Mediaeval themes.

The philosopher Jean-Jacques Rousseau spent the last weeks of his life in a cottage in this garden, in a part that had been inspired by his novel La Nouvelle Heloise (Julie, or the New Heloise). On his death he was interred on an island in the river, the Île des Peupliers; the neo-classical tomb and its attendant grove of poplar trees were depicted in several prints of the period – it became a place of pilgrimage for his many admirers. On October 11, 1794, his body was removed and reinterred in the Pantheon in Paris near the remains of Voltaire.

Because of its connection with Rousseau, the garden has attracted many famous visitors, including Joseph II of Austria, King Gustave III, the future Czar Paul I of Russia, Benjamin Franklin, Thomas Jefferson, Danton, Robespierre, Chateaubriand, Queen Marie Antoinette and Napoleon Bonaparte.

=== The Chateau de Pompignan (works 1745–1780, garden mainly 1766–1774) ===
This landscape garden with its follies was built by Jean-Jacques Lefranc de Pompignan, a friend of Rousseau. (Note: One of the few works of Lefranc to be read at all today and considered by some to be his masterpiece is his Ode sur la mort de Jean-Baptiste Rousseau [citation to come]. 'The Marquis felt himself to be very close to Jean-Jacques Rousseau, whose memory he honored in a celebrated and vengeful ode, and with whom he shared the same feeling of persecution justifying the escape into solitude, and the same taste for a healing Nature in the face of life's disillusionment'. (From the French in:Le Parc À Fabriques du Chateau de Pompignan: Une Illustration de l’Art des Jardins dans le Midi de la France, Yves et Marie-Françoise Cranga, in Memoirs de la Société Archéologique du Midi de la France, Toulouse, 2003, p. 198, footnote 51.)) It featured picturesque structures and mysterious ruins, and the walks and views took advantage of the park's site on a hillside overlooking the Garonne valley and, in the far distance, the chain of the Pyrenees, stretched out along the southern horizon. The chateau is still inhabited, and although the parc has been neglected for a very long time, vestiges of the works and walks are still to be seen.

=== Parc Monceau, Paris (1773–1778) ===
Parc Monceau was designed by Louis Carrogis Carmontelle (15 August 1717 – 26 December 1806), a French dramatist, painter, architect, set designer and author. In 1773, he was asked by the Duc de Chartres, the son of Louis-Philippe d'Orleans and the future Philippe Egalité, to design a garden around a small house that he was building to the northwest of Paris. Between 1773 and 1778, he created the folie de Chartres (now Parc Monceau), one of the most famous French landscape gardens of the time.

It departed from the more natural English landscape gardens of the time by presenting a series of fantastic scenes designed "to unite in one garden all places and all times." It included a series of fabriques, or architectural structures, while it illustrated all the styles known at the time: antiquity, exoticism, Chinese, Turkish, ruins, tombs, and rustic landscapes, all created to surprise and divert the visitor.

=== Désert de Retz, Yvelines (1774–1782) ===
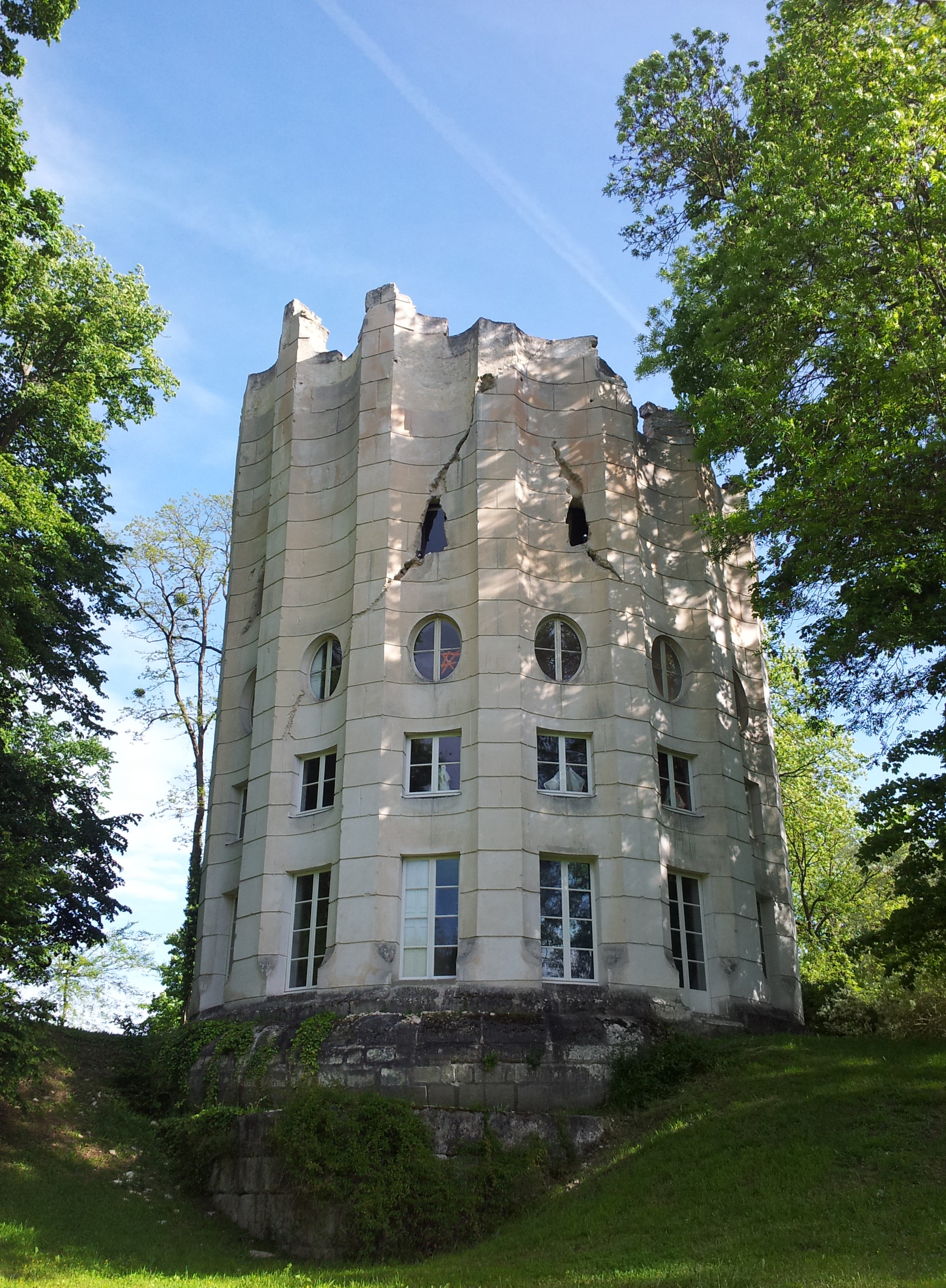
La Colonne détruite

The garden was created by François Racine de Monville (1734–1797), a French aristocrat, musician, architect and landscape designer. In 1774, de Monville bought a country estate at Saint-Jacques-de-Retz, which had a farm, lands, and a formal jardin à la française. He resolved to create a new garden in the new English style. He called the garden le Désert de Retz, (Note: The term 'désert' was defined at the time in the original French Encyclopedia as "a place propitious for cultivating dreams and nostalgia.") and planted it with four thousand trees from the royal greenhouses, and rerouted a river and created several ponds.

The garden, completed in 1785, contained twenty-one follies, or architectural constructions, representing different periods of history and parts of the world; they included an artificial rock, a temple of rest, a theatre, a Chinese house, a tomb, a ruined Gothic church, a ruined altar, an obelisk, a temple to the god Pan, a Siamese tent, and an ice-house in the form of a pyramid. The best-known feature was the ruined classical column, "La Colonne détruite", large enough to hold a residence inside.

=== The rustic village (hameau) as garden feature ===
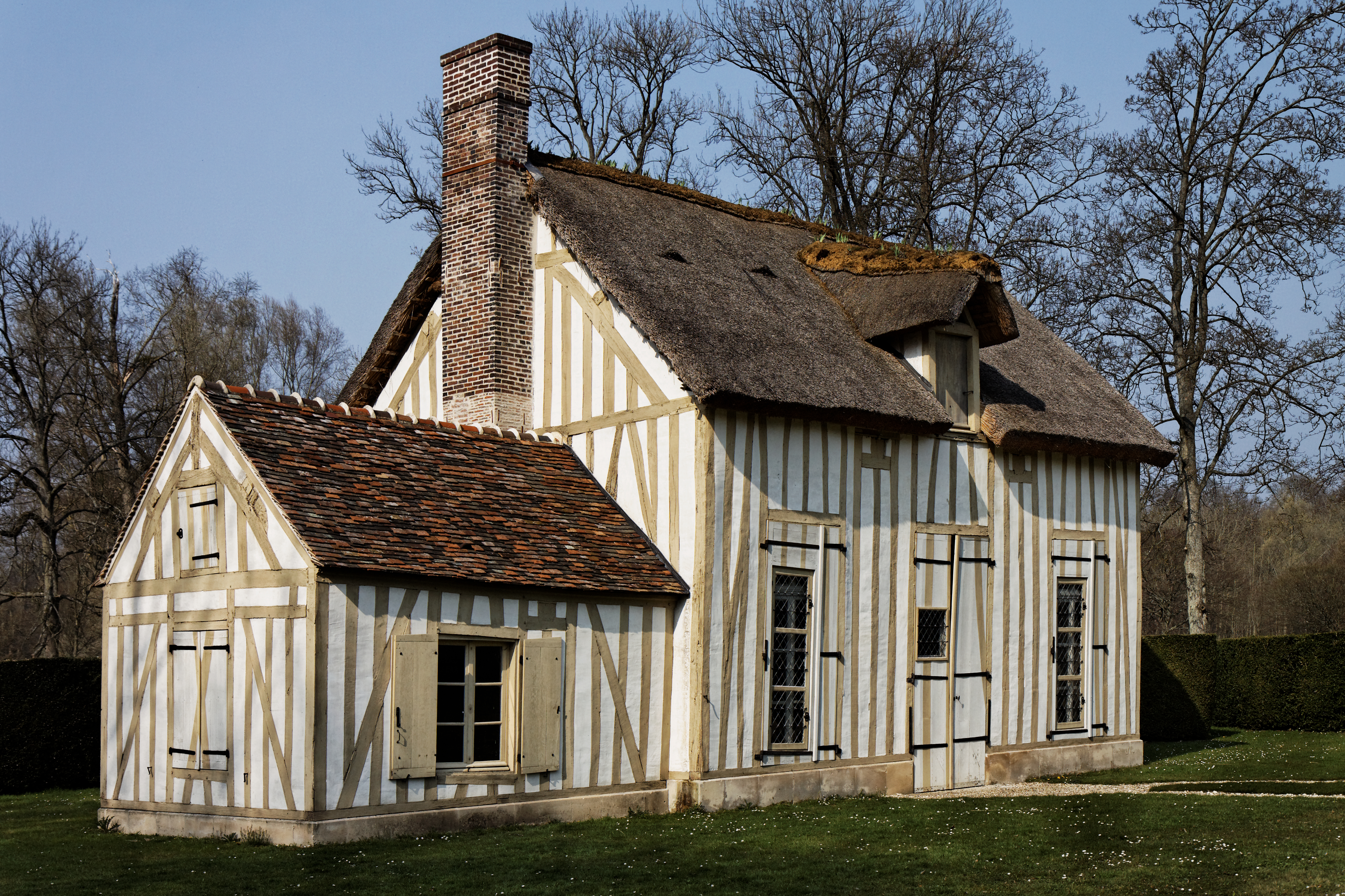
A cottage in the Hameau de Chantilly

Along with the development of the French landscape garden, there was a parallel development in the 18th century of ornamental farms and picturesque "villages". The first such ornamental farm in France was the Moulin Joly, but there were similar rustic buildings at Ermenonville, Parc Monceau, and the Domaine de Raincy. In 1774, the Prince de Condé conceived an entire rustic village, the Hameau de Chantilly, for his estate at the Château de Chantilly. The little village was modelled on a farm in Normandy, and had seven buildings with thatched roofs, designed by architect Jean-François Leroy. The exteriors were rustic, but the interiors were extremely elegant, and used for concerts, games, and dinners. They were used for a reception for members of the Russian imperial court in 1782.

=== Jardin de la reine, Versailles, (1774–1779) ===
In 1749 Louis XV had created a "jardin d'instruction" next to the gardens of Versailles, with domestic animals, a kitchen garden, and a botanical garden of plants brought from around the world. In 1750, he added a pavilion, designed by Ange-Jacques Gabriel, with a formal garden and a few winding paths and bosquets of trees in the new style. At one time he intended the Petit Trianon as a residence for Madame de Pompadour, who took an interest in the design of the house and its gardens. At her death in 1764 the unfinished house passed into the sphere of his new mistress Madame du Barry, who did little with it being more interested in her new Pavilion at Château de Louveciennes.

On his death the still unfinished property passed back into the possession of the new king, Louis XVI, who in 1774, presented it to his wife Marie-Antoinette. She had the house completed and commanded that a new garden be built in the new fashionable Anglo-Chinese style. The garden was designed by Richard Mique, Antoine Richard, and painter Hubert Robert. Richard was responsible for the choice of trees and plants, and Mique and Robert took charge of the composition and the follies, or architectural constructions.

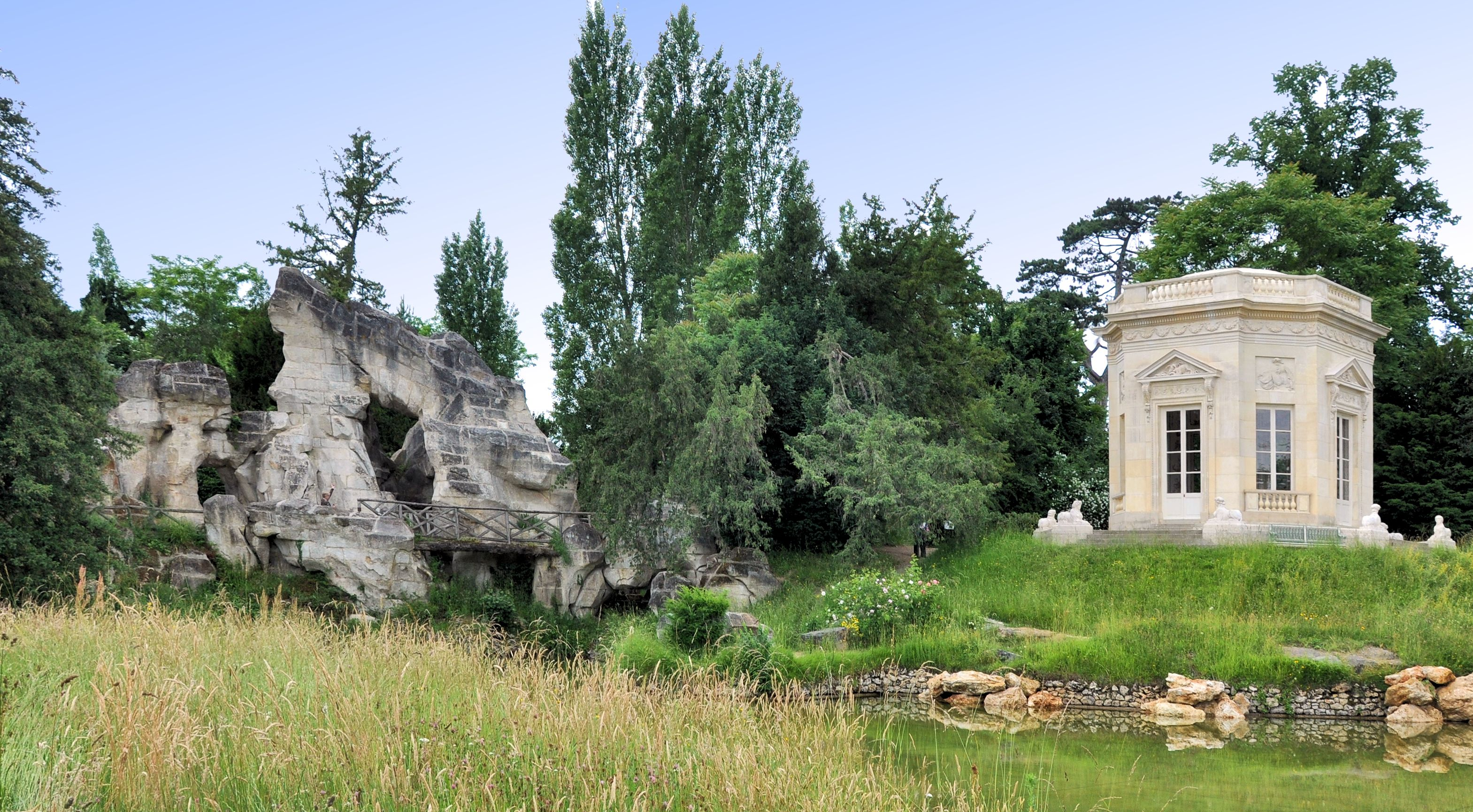
Belvédère and the Grand Rocher in the Petit Trianon gardens

The garden was conceived around a small stream whose source was in an artificial mountain called the "Grand Rocher". On one side was a butte with an octagonal belvedere on top. The Belvédère was also known as the pavilion of music, and was decorated with murals inspired by the paintings of Pompeii. The stream wound through the garden, and was crossed by bridges or stones. It formed an island on which was placed the Temple de l'Amour.

The construction of the garden required the destruction of the old botanical gardens which had formal layouts and several of the greenhouses. Some of the plants were incorporated into the new gardens, while others were sent to other royal gardens and the new Botanical Gardens in Paris.

In 1783 Marie Antionette ordered the creation of the Hameau de la Reine, the most famous of all the rustic villages created for gardens of the period. Between 1783 and 1787, the hamlet was thus created in the spirit of a Normandy village, with eleven houses spread out around the a lake. Five of the buildings were actual residences for staff engaged in farm work, while several contained suites of rooms for the queen and her guests to relax in.

=== Other gardens ===
- Gardens of the Château de Bagatelle, Paris (1777–1784)
- The Folie Saint James, Neuilly (1777–1780)
- Château de Méréville, Essonne (1784–1786)
- Château d'Harcourt (Thury-Harcourt)

== See also ==
- History of Parks and Gardens of Paris
- History of gardening
- List of Remarkable Gardens of France
- List of landscape gardens

== Bibliography ==
- Baltrušaitis, Jurgis (1978). Jardins en France 1760–1820 (in French). Paris: Caisse National des Monuments Historiques et des Sites. OCLC 174457405.
- Wenzler, Claude (2003). Architecture du Jardin (in French). Rennes: Editions Ouest-France.
- Prévôt, Philippe (2006). Histoire des jardins (in French). Editions Sud Ouest.
- Allain, Yves-Marie; Christiany, Janine (2006). L'art des jardins en Europe (in French). Paris: Citadelles.
- Racine, Michel, ed. (2001). "de la Renaissance au debut du XIX siècle". Créateurs des jardins et de paysages en France de la Renaissance au XXIe siècle ("The landscape gardeners of the 21st century French renaissance"). Vol. I. École Nationale Supérieure du Paysage.
