= Louis Carrogis Carmontelle =

French painter

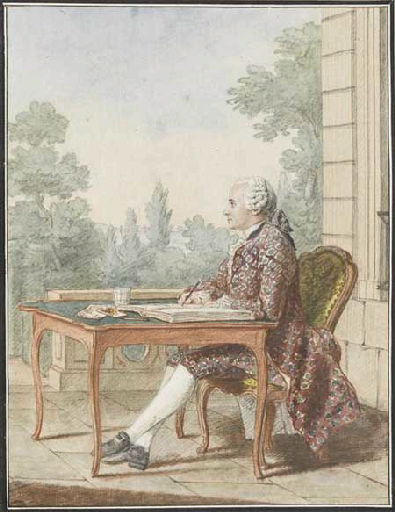
- Self-portrait, 1762.
- Born: Louis Carrogis Carmontelle; 15 August 1717; Paris, France
- Died: 26 December 1806 (aged 89); Paris, France
- Known for: Painting, watercolor painting
- Movement: Rococo

Louis Carrogis Carmontelle (15 August 1717 – 26 December 1806) was a French dramatist, painter, architect, set designer, author, and designer of one of the earliest examples of the French landscape garden, Parc Monceau in Paris. He also invented the transparent, an early ancestor of the magic lantern and motion picture, for viewing moving bands of landscape paintings.

== Biography ==
Carmontelle was born in Paris, and came from a modest background; his father was a bootmaker. He studied drawing and geometry, and at the age of twenty three qualified for the title of engineer, and entered the service of the Duc de Chevreuse and the Duc de Luynes at the Château de Dampierre, where he taught drawing and mathematics to the children.

In 1758, he entered the service of the Comte Pons de Saint-Maurice, governor of the Duc de Chartres and commander of regiment of Orléans-dragons as a topographical engineer. In addition to his drawing duties, he wrote farces and tales. After 1763 he entered into the service of Louis Philippe I, Duke of Orléans as a lecteur, responsible for providing theatrical performances for the family. He wrote and directed plays, decorated the scenery and made the costumes. In this way he invented a new genre of play, the proverbe dramatique, a scene of light comedy designed to be a point of departure for a theatrical improvisation. He also wrote plays for the famous ballerina, Marie-Madeleine Guimard for performance at the private theatre of her residence, Pantin.

In addition to his work in the theatre, he was a talented artist, who made portraits in pen and watercolor in less than two hours of notable people that he met. The most famous of his drawings is that of the infant Mozart playing the clavier.

== Parc Monceau ==
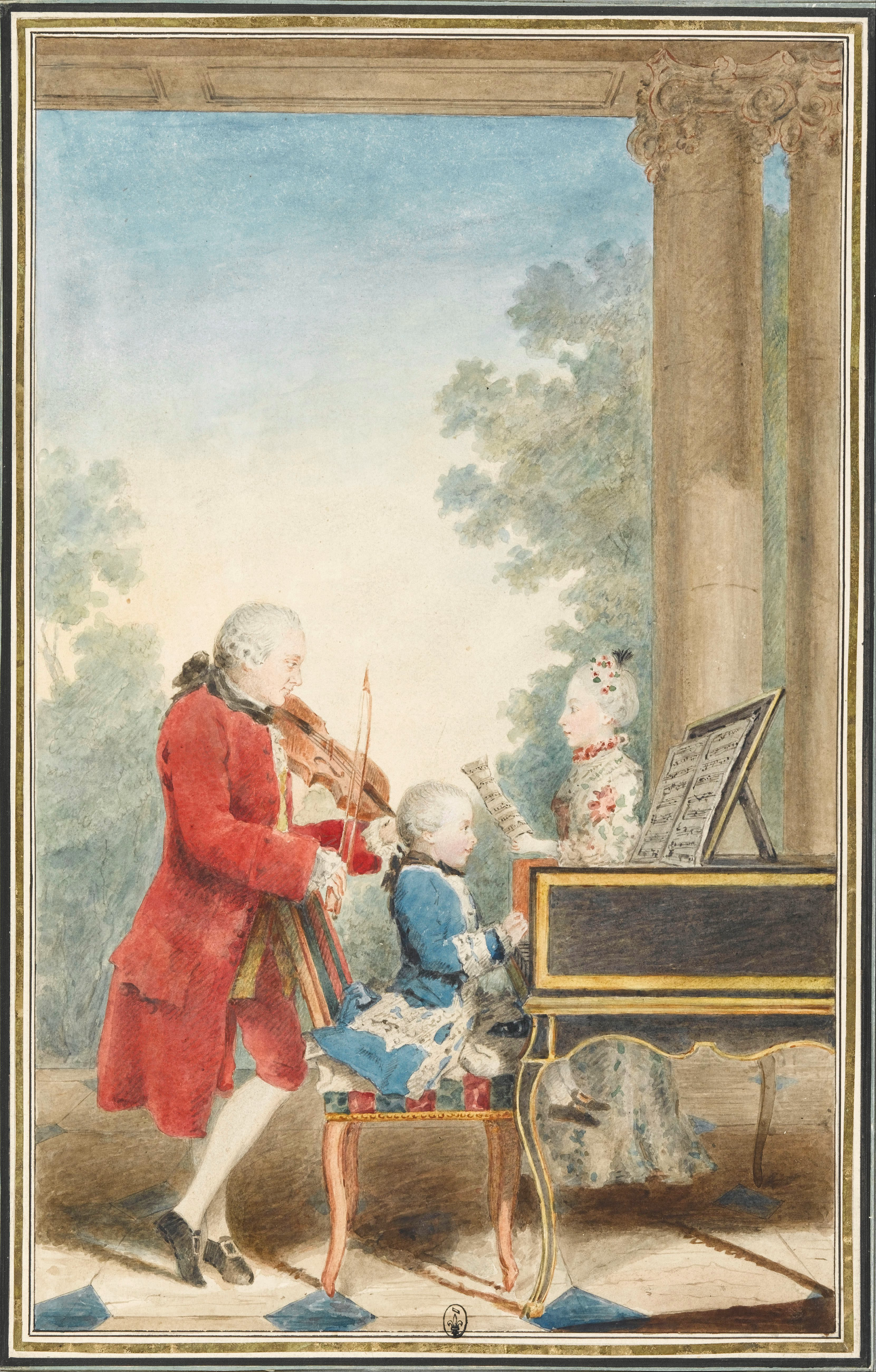
Carmontelle's watercolour (1763) of Leopold Mozart with Wolfgang Amadeus and Maria Anna is among his best-known works.

In 1773, he was asked by the Duc de Chartres, the son of Louis-Philippe d'Orléans and the future Philippe Egalité, to design a garden around a small house that he was building to the northwest of Paris. Between 1773 and 1778, he created the folie de Chartres, (now Parc Monceau), one of the most famous French landscape gardens of the time. It departed from the more natural English landscape gardens of the time by presenting a series of fantastic scenes designed "to unite in one garden all places and all times.". It included a series of fabriques, or architectural structures, while illustrated all the styles known at the time; antiquity, exoticism, Chinese, Turkish, ruins, tombs, and rustic landscapes, all created to surprise and divert the visitor.

After the death of the duc d'Orleans in 1785, Carmonetelle entered into the service of the Duc de Chartres, and taught drawing to his son Louis-Philippe of France, the future and last King of France, and his sister Adeleide.

== Introduction of animation into painting ==
In the last years of his life, he pioneered a new invention for showing paintings in motion, which was a distant ancestor of the motion picture. In 1783 he began working on what he termed "décors transparents animés." These were paintings of landscapes on long bands of paper, fifty centimeters high and as many as forty two meters long. These were mounted on two wooden rollers in a box, with the light of day coming into the box from behind and passing through the paper. The landscapes were slowly rolled from one roll to the other, giving the illusion of a walk in the garden. The first moving landscapes he titled "Landscapes of France," "English Gardens," "The Seasons," and "The Banks of the Seine." One of the moving landscapes is preserved at the Museum of Sceaux.

Carmontelle died in Paris.

== Gallery ==
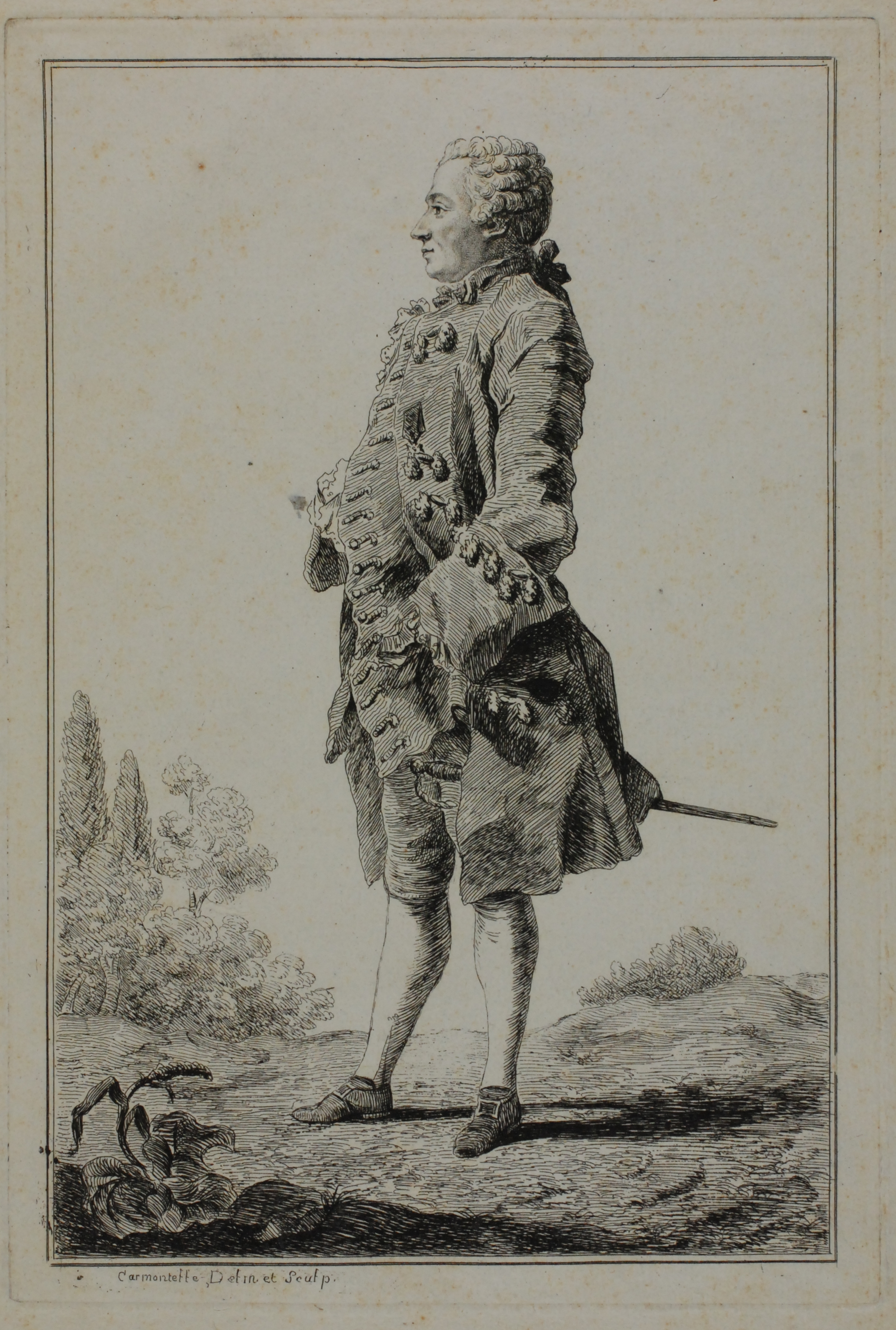
Pierre Victor, Baron de Besenval de Brunstatt, etching by Carmontelle (1780)

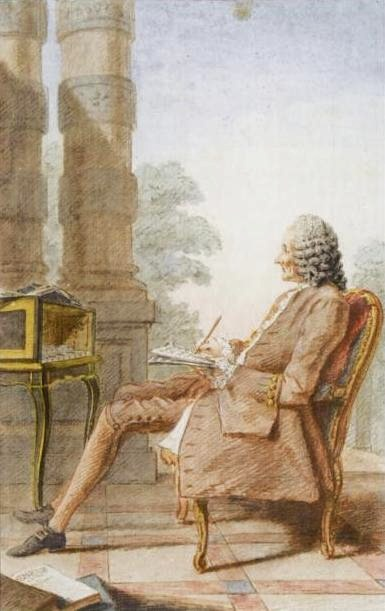
Carmontelle's watercolour (1760) of Jean-Philippe Rameau

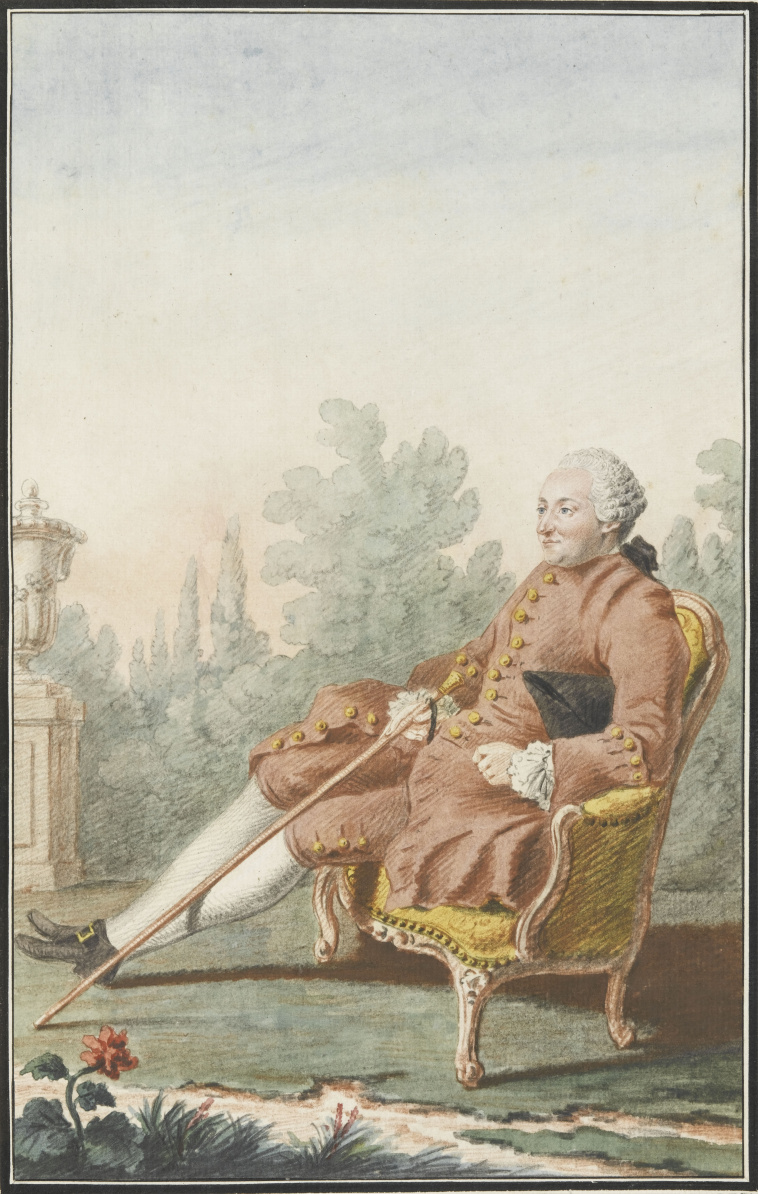
A portrait of Baron d'Holbach

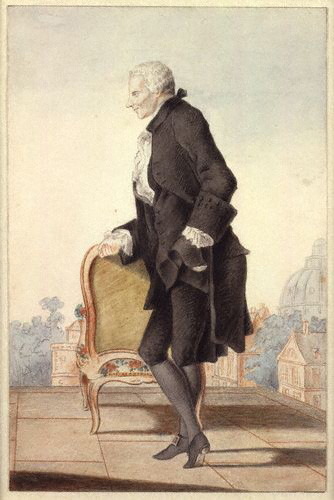
Carmontelle's watercolour (c. 1762) of Laurence Sterne

== Bibliography ==
- Jardins en France, 1760–1820. Caisse nationale des monuments historiques et des sites, Paris.
- Claude Wenzler, Architecture du Jardin. Editions Ouest-France, Rennes, 2003.
- Philippe Prévôt, Histoire des jardins, Editions Sud Ouest, 2006.
- Yves-Marie Allain and Janine Christiany, L'art des jardins en Europe, Citadelles, Paris, 2006
- Créateurs des jardins et de paysages en France de la Renaiisance au XXIe siècle, sous la direction de Michel Racine, Tome I, de la Renaissance au debut du XIX siècle, Actes Sud, École Nationale Supérieure du Paysage, 2001.
