= Parc Jean-Jacques Rousseau =

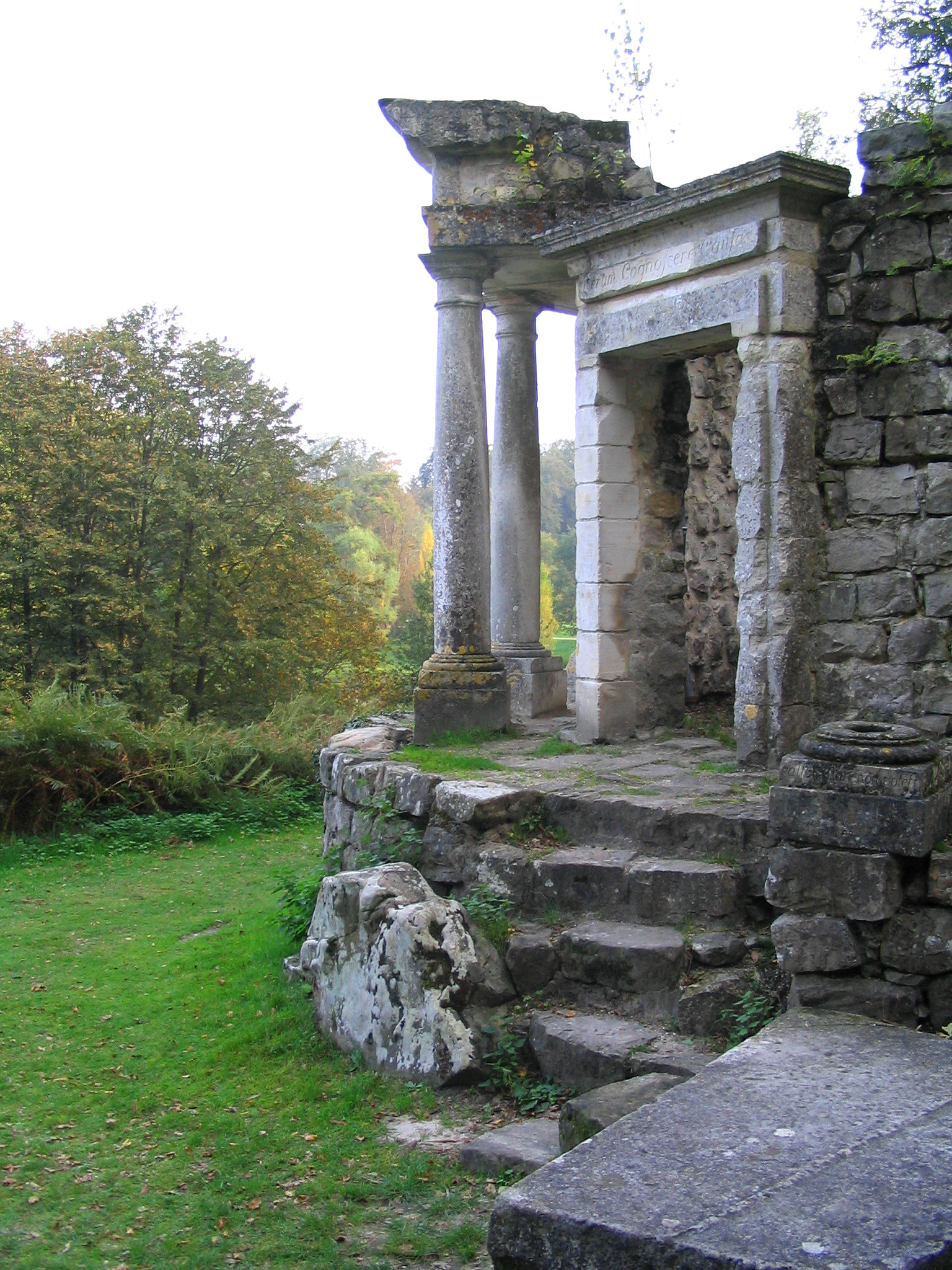
- The Temple of Modern Philosophy, a folly inspired by Rousseau. This building was left unfinished on purpose, symbolizing that "knowledge would never be complete and that philosophy will progress".
- Interactive map of Parc Jean-Jacques Rousseau
- Location: Ermenonville, France
- Coordinates: 49°7′16″N 2°41′28″E
- Created: 1765–1776
- Website: http://www.oise.fr/culture-et-vie-locale/le-parc-jean-jacques-rousseau/ Conseil général de l'Oise

The Parc Jean-Jacques-Rousseau is a French landscape garden at Ermenonville, in the Département of Oise. It is named for the philosopher Jean-Jacques Rousseau, who stayed there the last six weeks of his life. He died there in 1778 and was buried in an island in the park. The western part, called "le Désert" is managed by the Institut de France, and the northern part by a hotel/restaurant at the Château d'Ermenonville.

== History ==
The park at Ermenonville was created by René de Girardin (1735–1808). Girardin was an officer under Stanislas Leszczyński, and fought in the Seven Years' War. Girardin acquired a substantial inheritance from his mother René Hatte in 1762, enabling him to create his park and gardens at Ermenonville. Girardin brought in two hundred English workers to create his garden.

It was inspired by Jean-Jacques Rousseau's philosophy, in his 1761 work, Julie, or the New Heloise, drawing from the works of the English writers Joseph Addison, Alexander Pope and Anthony Ashley-Cooper, 3rd Earl of Shaftesbury, all three of whom had written on English gardens.

Girardin laid out the garden based on ideas expressed in an essay entitled De la composition des paysages sur le terrain ou des moyens d'embellir la nature près des habitations en y joignant l'agréable à l'utile ("On the creation of landscapes, or means of embellishing nature near inhabited places in merging the agreeable and the useful").

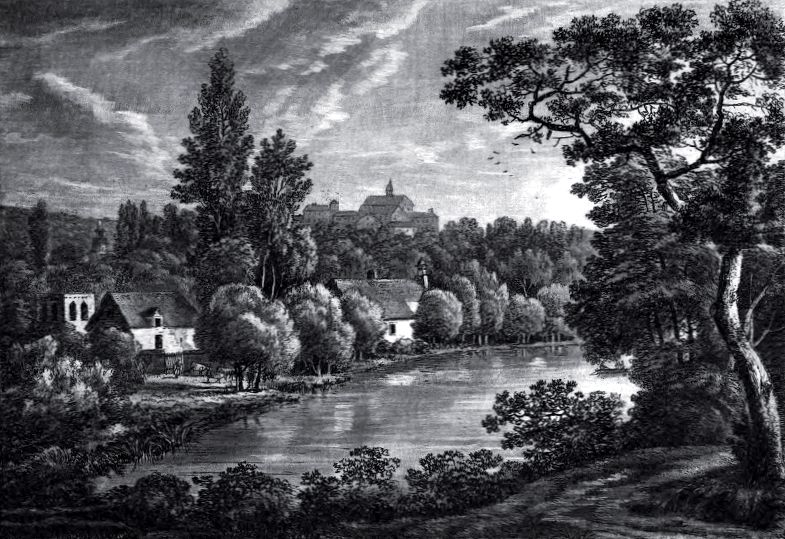
The buildings sitting by the west bank of the Petit Parc. The boats and houses on the parc are not available to walkers. They are part of the Abbaye de Chaalis.

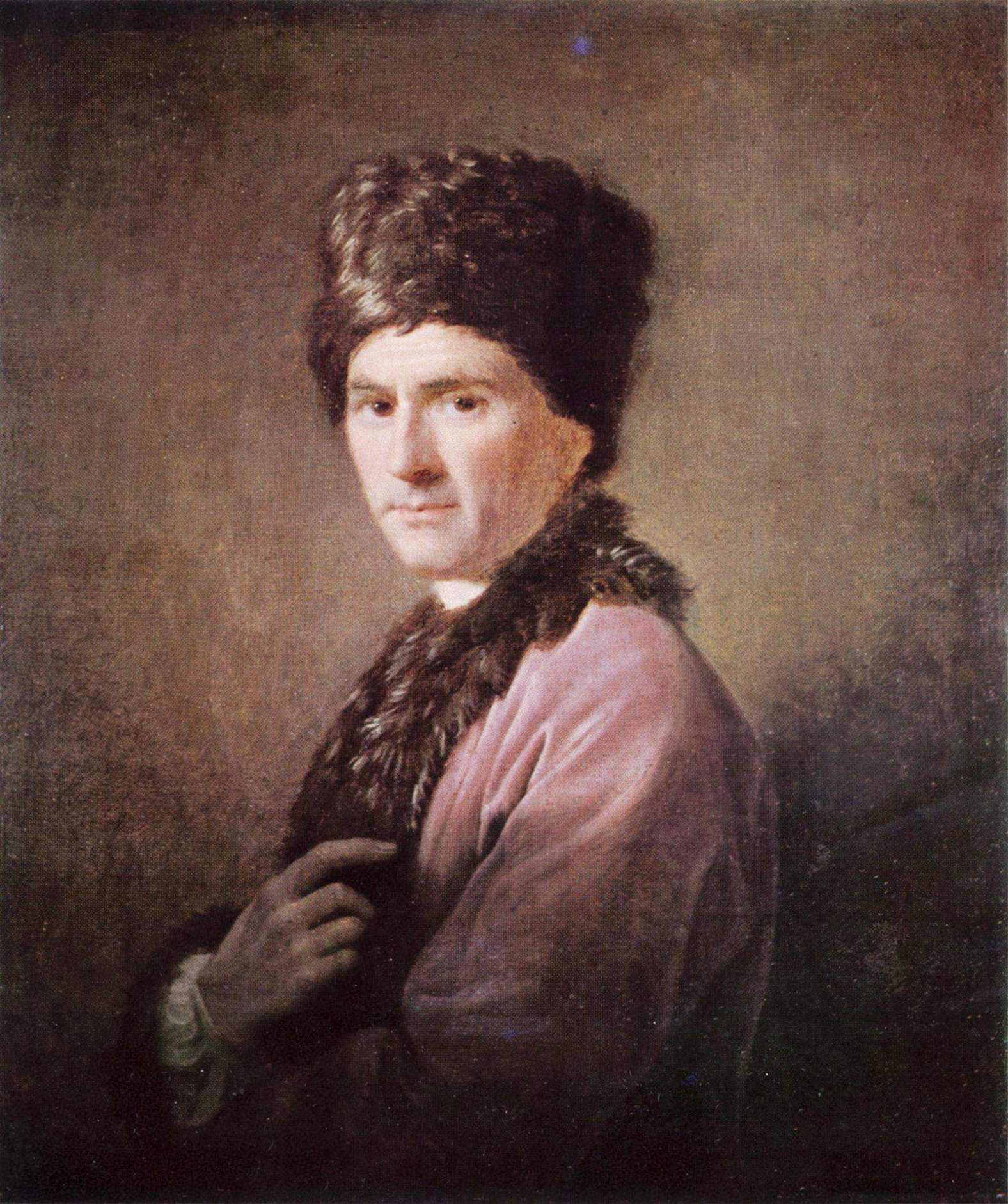
Jean-Jacques Rousseau in 1766

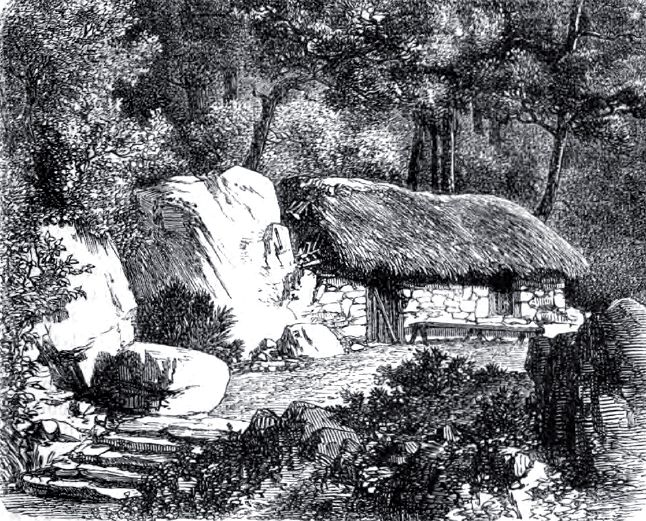
The "hut of the philosopher", where Jean-Jacques Rousseau spent long hours during his stay in 1778. Circa 1860.

In the 1770s Rousseau and Girardin met up in Paris. In the spring of 1778, Rousseau's common-law-wife Thérèse Levasseur fell into bad health, and her doctor advised her to have a rest in the countryside. The two then tried to find a new place to live.

Girardin, one of Rousseau's many admirers, invited them to stay at a cottage in his garden, and they did from May 1778. There, Rousseau recovered his extraordinary enthusiasm for nature. As he said to his friend Girardin: "For a long time, my heart drew me here, and what my eyes see, make me want to stay here always".

On the morning of 2 July 1778, as he was about to go teach music to Girardin's daughter, Rousseau died of cerebral bleeding resulting in an apoplectic stroke. On 4 July, Rousseau was buried at midnight, by torchlight, on a little island in the park which now bears his name. His remains were ceremonially relocated to the Panthéon national heroes repository in Paris in 1794.

On 26 December 1787, a violent storm devastated parts of the park, which were only partly repaired.

=== Modern ===
In 2019, the Park was classified as a Sensitive Natural Space.

== Reception ==
The park was considered one of the foremost English-style parks on the Continent, remarkable "for the landscapes it offered to visitors and the reflections it inspired in the course of a ramble".

It was visited in its early years by several prominent people, including Emperor Joseph II of Austria in 1777, Queen Marie-Antoinette in spring 1780, King Gustave III of Sweden in 1783, First Consul Napoléon Bonaparte several times beginning in 1800, as well as Benjamin Franklin and Maximilien de Robespierre.

== See also ==
- Jardin anglais
- Ermenonville
- Forêt d'Ermenonville
- Abbaye de Chaalis
