= Folie Saint James =

Garden in Paris, France (partially destroyed)

Coordinates: 48°52′56″N 2°15′31″E

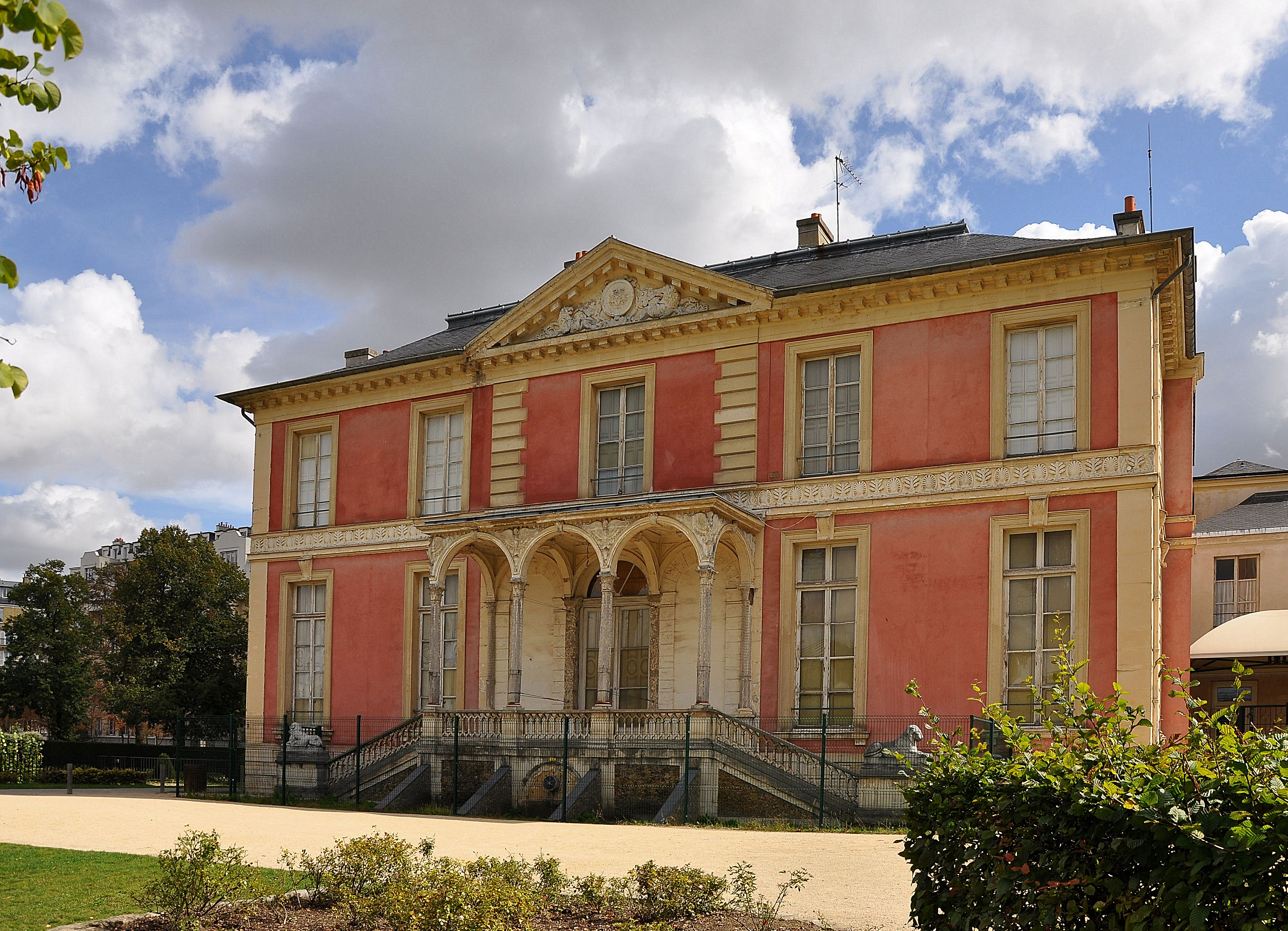
Folie Saint-James at 2011.

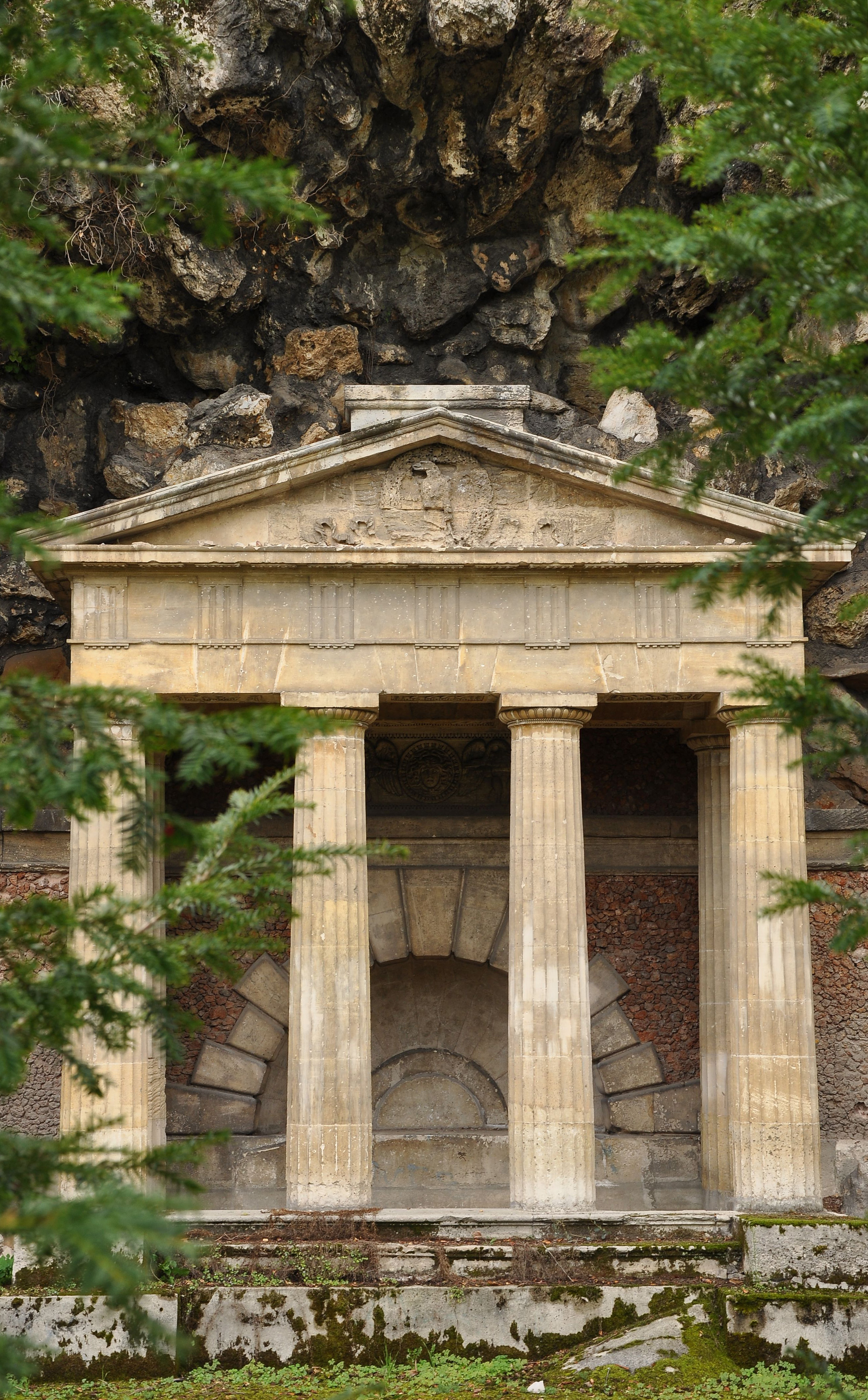
Doric temple in the artificial rock hill.

The Folie St. James was a French landscape garden created between 1777 and 1780 in the Paris suburb of Neuilly-sur-Seine by Claude Baudard de Saint James, the treasurer of the French Navy under Louis XV. It was the work of landscape architect François-Joseph Bélanger, who had designed the garden of the Bagatelle for the Comte d'Artois. Saint James instructed Bélanger: "make what you want as long as it's expensive."

The main attraction of the garden was a collection of forty-eight fabriques, or architectural constructions, placed on both sides of the avenue de Longchamp, and connected by two tunnels. The garden also featured a winding stream, crossed by numerous bridges. The fabriques included kiosques, a Chinese pavilion used an icehouse, temples, a thatched cottage, and an enormous artificial rock formation created of blocks of stone carried in carts from the Forest of Fontainebleau. The rock formation was forty three metres long, eighteen metres wide, and twelve metres high. The portico of a Doric temple was placed in an alcove of the rocks, and two staircases led up to view platforms on top of the rocks. Behind the rocks was a cascade of water which flowed into the stream. Inside the artificial rock hill was a winding tunnel encrusted with minerals and crystals, and several grottoes, as well as a bathing room with a vaulted ceiling and divans.

The Scottish gardener Thomas Blaikie described the Folie this way: "This garden is, without doubt, an example of extravagance rather than taste. There is a rock built in front of the house, or rather an arch made of great blocks of stone over which water seems to flow. But although it was built at great cost, it has nothing to do with nature or natural beauty, since the rocks are mixed with carved stones, and there is a small Corinthian temple in the centre, and all the rest is equally ridiculous, because there is no mountain or height in the vicinity to form this enormous mass of rocks."

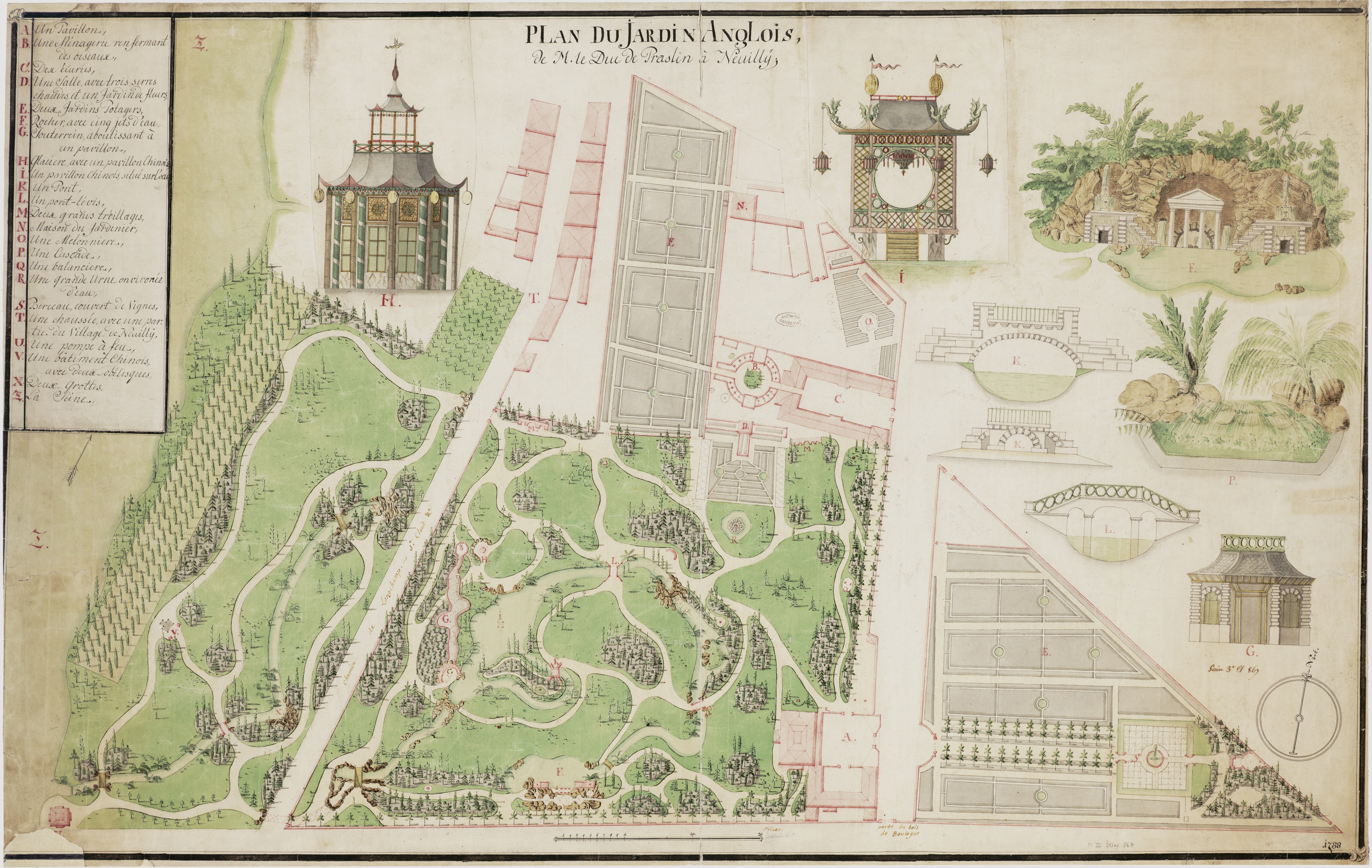
1788 map of the north part of the garden

Saint James was ruined by the financial crisis of 1780, and in 1787 all his belongings, including the Folie, were seized and sold. The garden was partially destroyed in 1895.
