= Temple de l'Amour =

Garden folly of the Palace of Versailles

Coordinates: 48°48′58″N 2°06′43″E

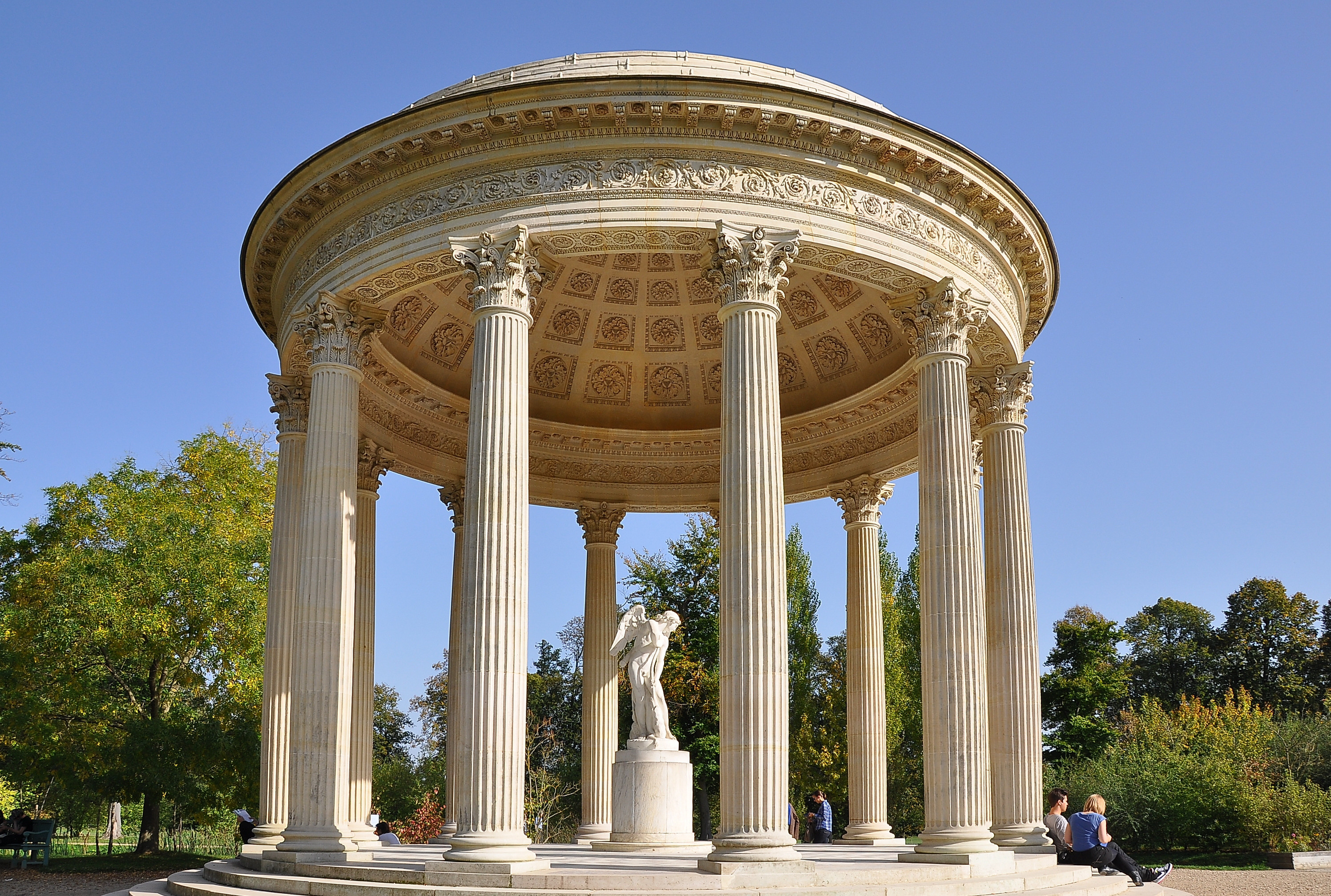
Temple de l'Amour

The temple de l'Amour (English: Temple of Love) is a garden folly of the Château de Versailles, and more specifically, in the Petit Trianon part of it. In the temple there is an angel which represents cupido (the lovemaker). This is one of the works of Richard Mique.

== Bibliography ==
- Duvernois, Christian (2008). Trianon : le domaine privé de Marie-Antoinette. Illustrated by François Halard. Actes Sud. p. 224. ISBN 978-2742778386. a.
- Desjardins, Gustave (1885). Le Petit Trianon. Versailles: L. Bernard. p. 470. b.
- de Nolhac, Pierre (1913). Le Trianon de Marie-Antoinette. Paris: Calmann-Lévy. p. 315. c.
- Arizzoli-Clémentel, Pierre (2008). L'Album de Marie-Antoinette. Alain de Gourcuff. p. 112. ISBN 978-2-35340-042-3. d.
- Jacquet, Nicolas (2011). "Les péripéties de l'Amour". Versailles secret et insolite. Paris: Parigramme. p. 208. ISBN 978-2-84096-664-7. f.
- Jacquet, Nicolas (2013). Secrets et curiosités des jardins de Versailles. Paris: Parigramme. p. 192. ISBN 978-2-84096-814-6. g.
