= Pascale Piera =

French politician (born 1967)

Pascale Piera MEP
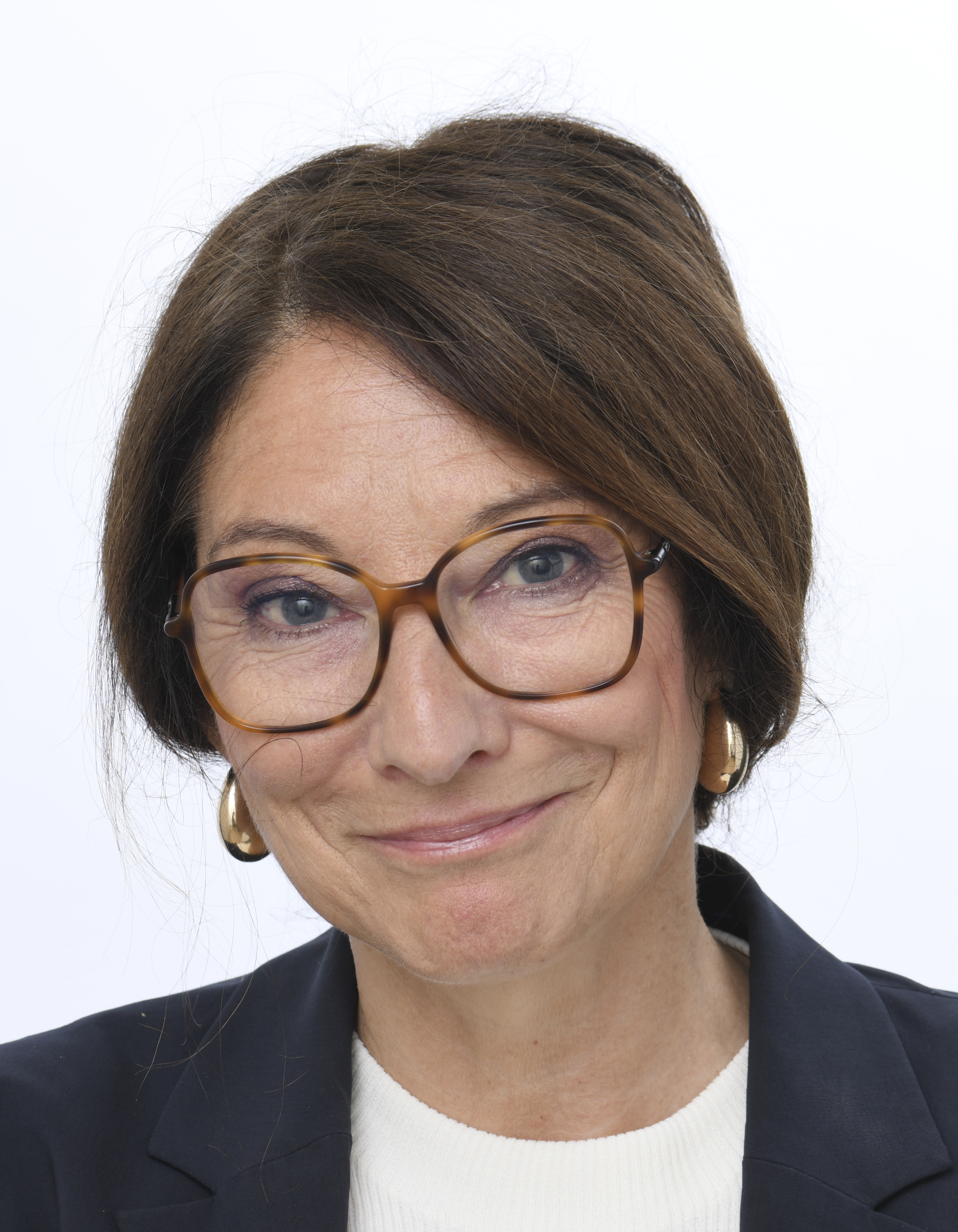

Member of the European Parliament for France
- Incumbent
- Assumed office 16 July 2024

Personal details
- Born: 23 February 1967 (age 59)
- Party: National Rally
- Other political affiliations: Identity and Democracy Party

Pascale Piera (born 23 February 1967) is a French politician of the National Rally who was elected member of the European Parliament in 2024. She previously served as an investigating judge, and became known for her indictment of Jean-Christophe Canter in 2009. From 2020 to 2023, she was a member of the municipal council of Senlis.

== See also ==
- List of members of the European Parliament for Cyprus, 2024–2029
