= Ermenonville =

- Commune
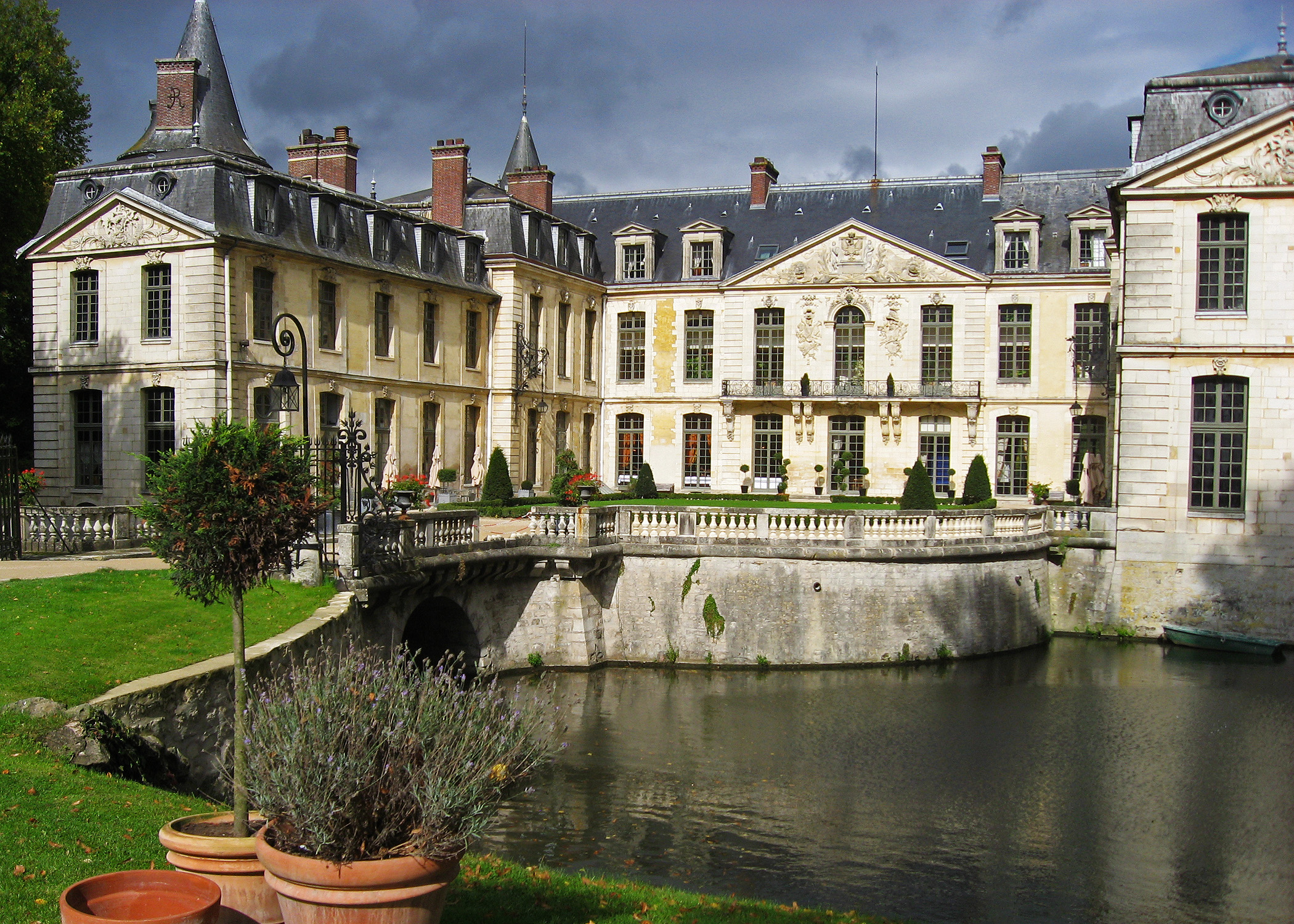
- Castle of Ermenonville

- Coat of arms
- Location of Ermenonville
- Location within France Location within Hauts-de-France
- Coordinates: 49°07′36″N 2°41′48″E
- Country: France
- Region: Hauts-de-France
- Department: Oise
- Arrondissement: Senlis
- Canton: Nanteuil-le-Haudouin
- Intercommunality: Pays de Valois

Government
  - Mayor (2020–2026): Jean-Michel Cazeres
- Area^{1}: 16.49 km^{2} (6.37 sq mi)
- Elevation: 92 m (302 ft)
- Highest elevation: 122 m (400 ft)
- Lowest elevation: 71 m (233 ft)
- Population (2023): 906
  - Density: 54.9/km^{2} (142/sq mi)
- Time zone: UTC+01:00 (CET)
  - Summer (DST): UTC+02:00 (CEST)
- INSEE/Postal code: 60213 /60950
- ^{1} French Land Register data, which excludes lakes, ponds, glaciers > 1 km^{2} (0.386 sq mi or 247 acres) and river estuaries.

Ermenonville (French pronunciation: [ɛʁmənɔ̃vil]) is a commune in the Oise department, northern France. Located near Paris, Ermenonville is notable for its park named for Jean-Jacques Rousseau by René Louis de Girardin. Rousseau's tomb was designed by the painter Hubert Robert, and sits on the Isle of Poplars in its lake.

== History ==
On 3 March 1974, Turkish Airlines Flight 981 crashed in the Ermenonville Forest in Fontaine-Chaalis, Oise, near Ermenonville killing all 346 occupants onboard.

Three town councilors died on 1 June 2009 when Air France Flight 447 crashed into the Atlantic killing all 228 occupants onboard.

== Park ==
The garden at Ermenonville was one of the earliest and finest examples of the French landscape garden. The garden at Ermenonville was planned beginning in 1762 by Marquis René Louis de Girardin, the friend and final patron of Jean-Jacques Rousseau. Girardin's master plan drew its inspiration from Rousseau's novels and philosophy of the nobility of Nature.

Rousseau's tomb is prominently situated on the artificial island in Ermenonville's lake. It is remarked that Hubert Robert was the architect. Completed by 1778 with care and craft, the garden came to resemble a natural environment, almost a wilderness, appearing untouched by any human intervention. Girardin admired the work of William Shenstone at The Leasowes and made a ferme ornée (decorative farm) at Ermenonville. An imitation of Rousseau's island is at Dessau-Wörlitz Garden Realm, Germany.

During the early nineteenth century it was much visited and admired. The garden at Ermenonville was described by Girardin's son in 1811 in an elegant tour-book with aquatint plates that reveal Girardin's love of diverse vistas that capture painterly landscape effects. Enhancing the elegiac mood of these views were the altars and monuments, the 'Rustic Temple', and other details meant to evoke Rousseau's Julie, ou la nouvelle Héloïse.

Nearby is Rousseau's 'cabin' in the secluded désert of Ermenonville.

Napoleon Bonaparte visited Ermenonville, where he remarked to Girardin that it might have been better for the French peace if neither he nor Rousseau had ever been born. Girardin retold this story again and again after the fact.

== Population ==
Ermenonville has a population of 1,007. Its proximity to Charles de Gaulle Airport causes it to have the highest-density of Air France employees among French communes.

== See also ==
- Communes of the Oise department
