= Arthur Dehaine =

French politician (1932–2020)

Member of the French National Assembly for Oise's 4th Constituency
- In office 18 November 1976 – 22 May 1981
- Preceded by: René Quentier
- Succeeded by: Jean Anciant

Member of the French National Assembly for Oise
- In office 18 April 1986 – 14 May 1988
- Preceded by: Marcel Dassault
- Succeeded by: Éric Woerth

Member of the French National Assembly for Oise's 4th constituency
- In office 23 June 1988 – 18 June 2002
- Preceded by: Office established
- Succeeded by: Jean-François Mancel

Mayor of Senlis
- In office 1974–2008

Personal details
- Born: 20 June 1932 Senlis, France
- Died: 24 May 2020 (aged 87) Senlis, France
- Party: RPR

Arthur Dehaine (20 June 1932 – 24 May 2020) was a French politician.

== Biography ==
An accountant by profession, Dehaine joined the National Assembly representing Oise after René Quentier's death on 18 November 1976. He was defeated in 1981, but returned to his seat in 1986 following the death of Marcel Dassault. He stayed in office until 2002, succeeded by Éric Woerth. Dehaine also served as Mayor of Senlis from 1974 to 2008 after succeeding Jean Reymond.

In 2002, Dehaine was knighted into the Legion of Honour.
