= Jean-Christophe Canter =

French politician

Jean-Christophe Canter (born 15 October 1960) is a French politician, former mayor of the city of Senlis (Oise), and member of the UMP party/movement (Union for a Popular Movement).

== Biography ==
He began his career in the French media as Director General of the daily national newspaper Le Figaro, thereafter deputy director of TV Magazine and later deputy director of the French daily, France Soir. Since 2008, Jean-Christophe Canter is Director of Press relations at the National Institute of Security and Justice Studies (INHESJ), which is under the auspices of the Prime Minister's administration.

Politically, Jean-Christophe Canter is known to promote the social values of the popular right wing within the UMP party. His vision of the European Union does not include Turkey, as promoted by other members of the UMP, but rather one that would welcome East European countries into the Union, such as Russia and Ukraine.

Jean-Christophe Canter was elected mayor of Senlis in 2008 without the support of his own party, the UMP, which created an intraparty wedge between his list and another list led by Christian Patria, Regional Deputy with the active support of Eric Woerth, Mayor of near-by Chantilly. Woerth was Finance Minister and then Minister in charge of the Retirement Reform bill who recently left Nicolas Sarkozy’s government in the wake of the scandal surrounding the Loréal heiress, Liliane Bettencourt, and the sources of funding for Nicolas Sarkozy’s presidential campaign.

After his election, accusations were brought against Jean-Christophe Canter, who finds himself today in an uneasy position in City Hall. In an interview with the press in October 2010 he declared that he will publish a book in January 2011 entitled, “Eric m’a Tuer” (“Eric killed me”) in which he will explain how the former Minister Woerth did his part or contributed to Canter's brush with the Judiciary.

In 2011, Canter lost his mayoral post to Pascale Loiseleur.
