= Christian Patria =

French politician

Member of the National Assembly for Oise's 4th constituency
- In office 2007–2010
- Preceded by: Éric Woerth
- Succeeded by: Éric Woerth

Personal details
- Born: 9 January 1945; Fontaine-Chaalis, France
- Died: 10 February 2014 (aged 69); Senlis, France
- Political party: UMP

Christian Patria (January 9, 1945, in Fontaine-Chaalis – February 10, 2014) was a French politician and a member of the National Assembly of France. He represented the Oise department, and was a member of the Union for a Popular Movement.
