= Flight 981 =

Flight Number 981 may refer to:

- Turkish Airlines Flight 981 (1974), crashed at Ermenonville forest outside Paris, killing 346 - cargo door failure
- Flydubai Flight 981 (2016), crashed near Rostov-on-Don, Rostov Oblast, Russia, killing 62 - pilot error
