= 1956 Swissair Convair CV-440 crash =

1956 flight accident on a Swissair delivery flight

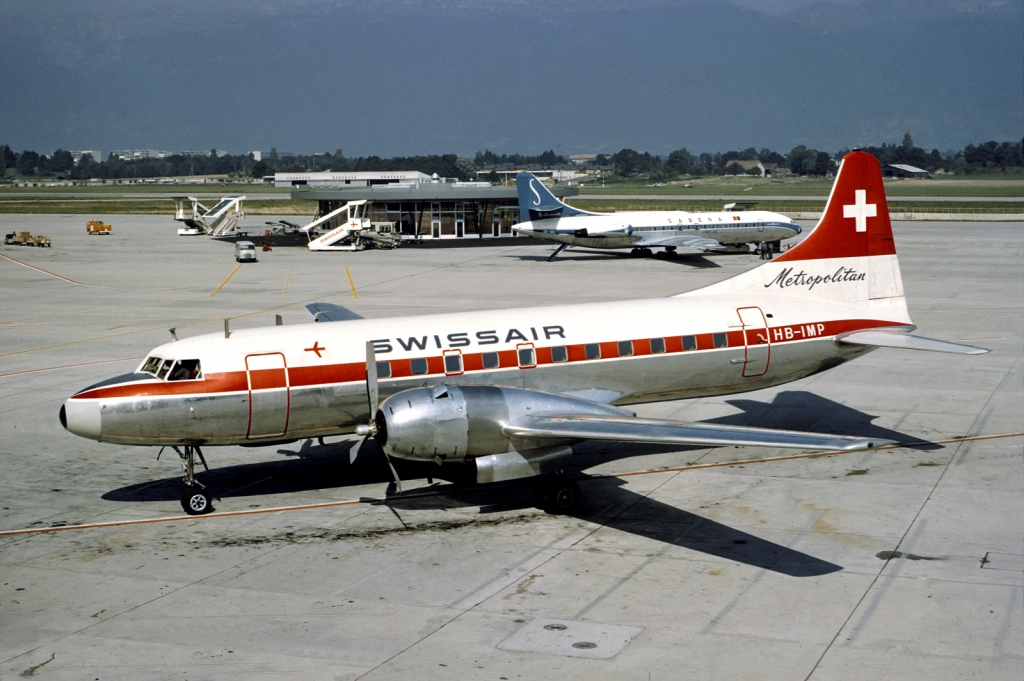
- An identical Swissair aircraft to the one involved in the accident

Accident
- Date: July 15, 1956
- Summary: Loss of control on final approach
- Site: Shannon, Ireland

Aircraft
- Aircraft type: Convair CV-440-11
- Operator: Swissair
- Registration: HB-IMD
- Flight origin: San Diego Airport, California, United States
- Stopover: New York-Idlewild International Airport (now John F. Kennedy International Airport), United States
- 2nd stopover: Gander Airport, Canada
- Last stopover: Shannon Airport, Ireland
- Destination: Zurich Airport, Switzerland
- Occupants: 4
- Passengers: 0
- Crew: 4
- Fatalities: 4

A Swissair Convair CV-440 crashed on an intercontinental delivery flight from San Diego to Zurich with stopovers in New York City, Gander and Shannon on 15 July 1956. During the final approach to Shannon Airport, the pilots lost control of the aircraft, which then crashed to the ground and broke apart. All four occupants of the plane died in the accident.

== Background ==
=== Aircraft ===
The involved aircraft was a brand new Convair CV-440-11 built in June 1956 and certified on 10 July 1956, which was taken over by Swissair on 11 July 1956 with the aircraft registration HB-IMD. It had 33 flight hours at the time of the accident.

=== Occupants ===
As the flight was a delivery flight, only a crew of four was on board the aircraft.

== Flight timeline ==
The Convair took off from San Diego on 12 July at 04:07 GMT for its delivery flight. Two days later on 14 July the aircraft took off from New York at 12:40 and arrived in Gander at 16:59 on the same day. After a short stopover, it took off at 17:48 for Shannon Airport. After a routine Atlantic crossing without incident, approach clearance for Shannon was issued at 0:08. The pilots were then instructed to fly holding loops as four other aircraft in the area were already waiting to land. At 01:25, the pilots initiated a ground controlled approach on runway 23, which they continued until they were able to make visual contact with the ground. They then switched to an approach to runway 05. During the turn for the final approach the aircraft, which had a steep roll angle, suddenly began to drop. The Convair hit the ground at 01:35 local time, killing all four occupants.

== Probable cause ==
After investigations were completed, it was concluded that the aircraft probably crashed due to a misjudgment made by the captain, which led to an abnormally sharp turn being flown for the final approach, causing the aircraft to lose control and hit the ground. Identified as possible contributing factors were that the crew did not have enough visual reference points to perform such a maneuver at low altitude at night and that the pilots had been impaired in their judgment and ability to act due to their long time on duty.
