= Geadis Geadi =

Cypriot politician

Geadis Geadi MEP
- Γεάδης Γεάδη
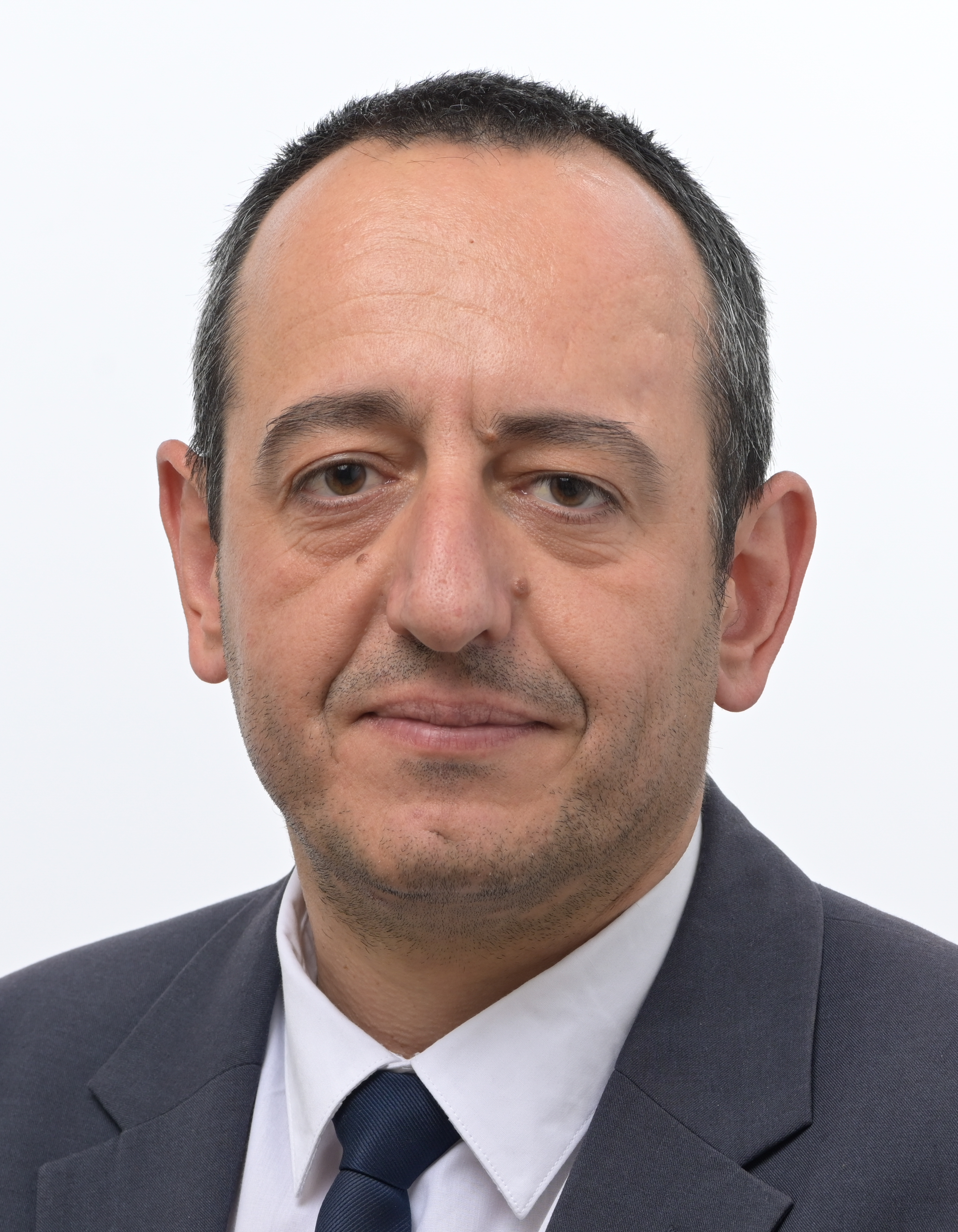
- Official portrait, 2024

Member of the European Parliament
- Incumbent
- Assumed office 16 July 2024
- Constituency: Cyprus

Personal details
- Born: 1 September 1984 (age 42)
- Party: ELAM
- Occupation: Politician

== Introduction ==
Geadis Geadi (born 1 September 1984) is a Greek-Cypriot politician from ELAM. He was elected Member of the European Parliament (MEP) in the 2024 European Parliament election..

== European Parliament (2024- ) ==
He is part of the ECR Group in the European Parliament, and full member of the committees of AFET, the Delegation to the EU-Turkey Joint Parliamentary Committee (D-TR), the Delegation to the EU-Armenia Parliamentary Partnership Committee, the EU-Azerbaijan Parliamentary Cooperation Committee and the EU-Georgia Parliamentary Association Committee (DSCA) and Delegation to the Parliamentary Assembly of the Union for the Mediterranean (DMED). He is also a substitute member of the committees of LIBE, EMPL, and the Delegation to the EU-Serbia Stabilisation and Association Parliamentary Committee (D-RS), Delegation for relations with the Mashreq countries, (DMAS), Delegation to the Euronest Parliamentary Assembly (DEPA).

=== Main Ideologies as an MEP ===
He follows the firm stance of his national party against the illegal occupation of Cyprus by Turkish military forces, representing this view on the European Parliament stage by bringing crucial amendments to the Commissions' 2025 Report on Turkey.

Additionally, he supports the European right-wing ideology of fighting against illegal and irregular migration to Europe, as well as the far-lefts 'woke agenda'.

== See also ==
- List of members of the European Parliament for Cyprus, 2024–2029
