= Loss of control (aeronautics) =

Unintended departure from controlled flight

In aeronautics, loss of control (LOC) is the unintended departure of an aircraft from controlled flight and is a significant factor in several aviation accidents worldwide. In 2015 it was the leading cause of general aviation accidents. Loss of control may be the result of mechanical failure, external disturbances, aircraft upset conditions, or inappropriate crew actions or responses.

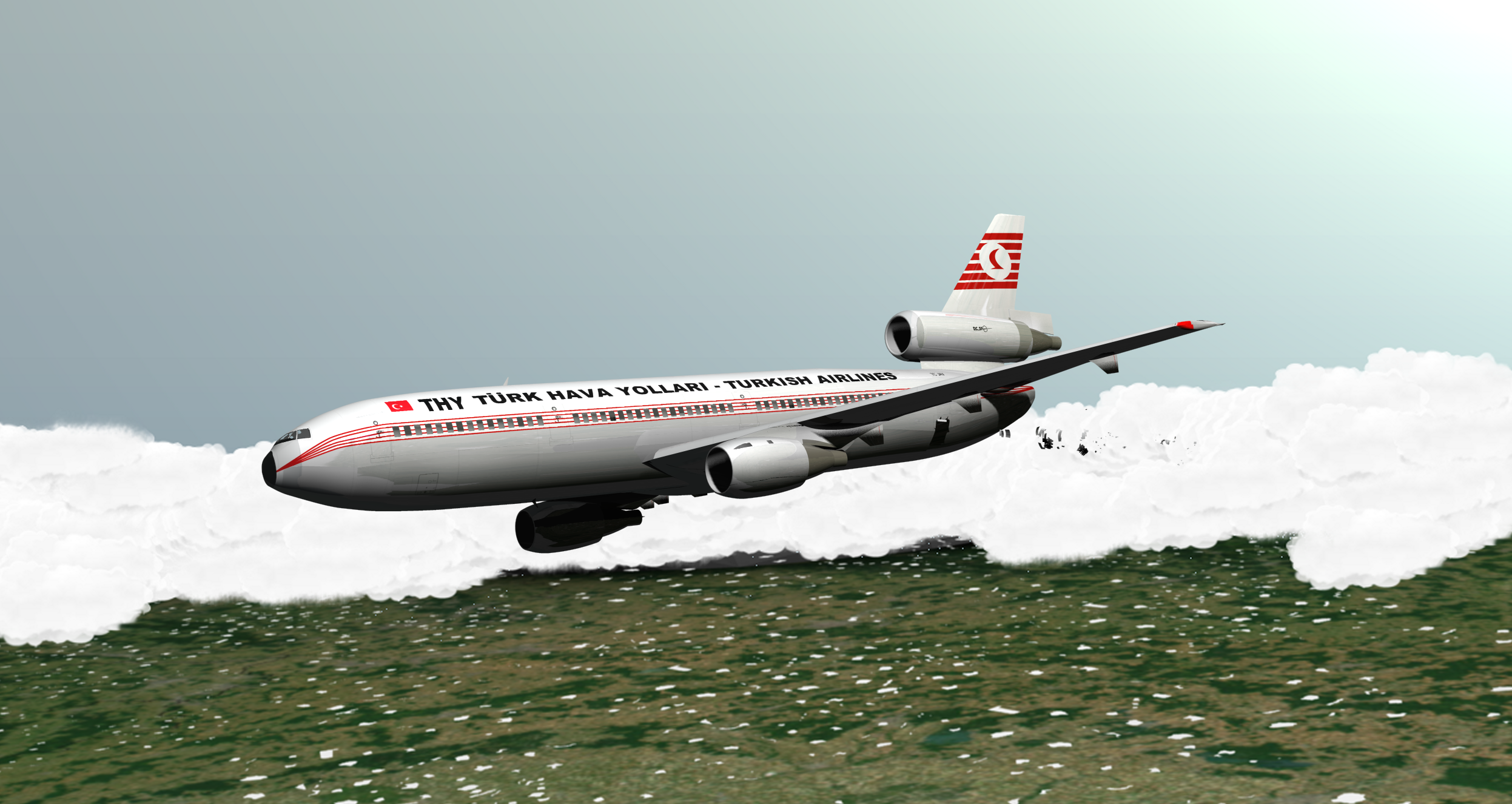
CGI rendering of Turkish Airlines Flight 981, a 1974 flight that encountered a loss of control event due to a cargo door blowout, and subsequently crashed in Ermenonville Forest, France

== Causes ==
Loss of control causes aircraft to depart from normal flight and possibly reach altitudes or encounter situations from which it can be difficult or impossible to recover, such as a stall or a spin. Due to the certification and design processes, it is extremely rare for aircraft to experience a loss of control without extreme mishandling or a technical defect.

A NASA study focused on identifying causal factors and addressing mitigation challenges related to aircraft loss of control had developed a preliminary list of contributing factors through a process that involved interviews, reviews of accident reports, and team analysis of available data. Causal factors in the list were segregated into three categories: (1) pilot- or human-induced; (2) environmentally-induced; and (3) systems-induced. The following list does not order the causal factors by frequency of occurrence or importance.

Contributing factors involving inappropriate pilot actions may include:

- Poor judgment
- Failure to recognize a stall or spin and execute corrective action
- Intentional failure to comply with regulations
- Failure to maintain airspeed
- Failure to follow the procedure
- Pilot inexperience or lack of proficiency
- Use of prohibited drugs or alcohol

== Notable accidents ==
Loss of control has been the cause of many air disasters, some of which are listed below.

- Aeroflot Flight 8641: Metal fatigue in the jackscrew of the horizontal stabilizer caused the component to fail while the plane was en route from Leningrad to Kyiv, Ukraine, on 28 June 1982. The crew lost control of the plane, and at 10:50 crashed just south of the city of Mazyr in Belarus, killing all on board. In the aftermath of the tragedy, authorities grounded all Yakovlev Yak-42 jets, and the planes underwent major design changes until they were deemed worthy to fly again in late 1984.
- Japan Air Lines Flight 123 was a scheduled domestic Japan Airlines passenger flight from Tokyo's Haneda Airport to Osaka International Airport, Japan. On August 12, 1985, a Boeing 747SR operating this route suffered a sudden decompression twelve minutes into the flight, which blew off the aircraft's tail flight control surfaces and destroyed the aircraft's hydraulics, rendering the remaining flight control surfaces on the wings inoperable. Thirty-two minutes later, after multiple attempts by the crew to regain control, the flight crashed. The crash site was on Mount Takamagahara.
- China Northwest Airlines Flight 2303 lost control during take-off from Xi'an, China. The aircraft, a Tupolev Tu-154, had had maintenance carried out before its flight, and the autopilot yaw channel had been erroneously connected to the bank control, and vice versa. Additionally, this incorrect maintenance was not done in a properly approved facility. When the pilot engaged the autopilot, the aircraft began to oscillate violently. Any attempts to rectify matters only made things worse, and the plane shook itself to pieces, breaking up in midair before the crew could react, killing all on board.
- Lauda Air Flight 004: On 26 May 1991, the Boeing 767-3Z9ER named Mozart left Don Mueang International Airport, Bangkok, Thailand, en route to Vienna. When the Mozart reached thirty-two thousand feet, the crew received a visual warning indicating that a possible system failure would cause the thrust reverser on the number 1 engine to deploy in flight. Having consulted the aircraft's Quick Reference Handbook, they determined that it was "just an advisory thing" and took no action. At 23:17, the thrust reverser on the number 1 engine deployed while the plane was over mountainous jungle terrain of Thailand. The First Officer Thurner's last recorded words were, "Oh, reverser's deployed!" The 767 stalled in mid-air and entered a spiral dive to the left, disintegrating at 4,000 feet (1,200 m). All 223 people on board were killed. Hikers arrived at the crash site and made video recordings of the wreckage.
- United Airlines Flight 585: On March 3 1991, the Boeing 737-200 was on final approach to Colorado Springs Municipal Airport from Stapleton when it spun out of control, banking right, then rolled upside down before entering a downward spiral to the right. The aircraft disintegrated when it hit the ground. All 20 passengers and 5 crew were killed.
- USAir Flight 427: On September 8, 1994, a Boeing 737 spun out of control and crashed, three years after United Airlines Flight 585. The Boeing 737-3B7, tail registry N513AU, was approaching runway 28R of Pittsburgh International Airport, located in Findlay Township, Pennsylvania. The aircraft suddenly banked violently to the left, rolled upside down, then went into a downward spiral while rolling left. The jet then crashed near the airport, killing all 127 passengers and 5 crew. The bodies of the occupants were so severely fragmented that the crash site was initially declared a biohazard by the NTSB. Both this and United Airlines Flight 585 crashes were traced to a malfunction in the planes' rudder controls.
- American Eagle Flight 4184: A flight from Indianapolis to Chicago, using an ATR-72, was preparing for landing when the right aileron suddenly moved upward, causing the right wing to drop abruptly. The plane pitched down and went into a dive, corkscrewing about its right wing, and impacted the ground in a soybean field near Roselawn, Indiana. All 64 passengers and 4 crew members perished. Investigators determined that the crash was caused by atmospheric icing disrupting airflow over the right wing.

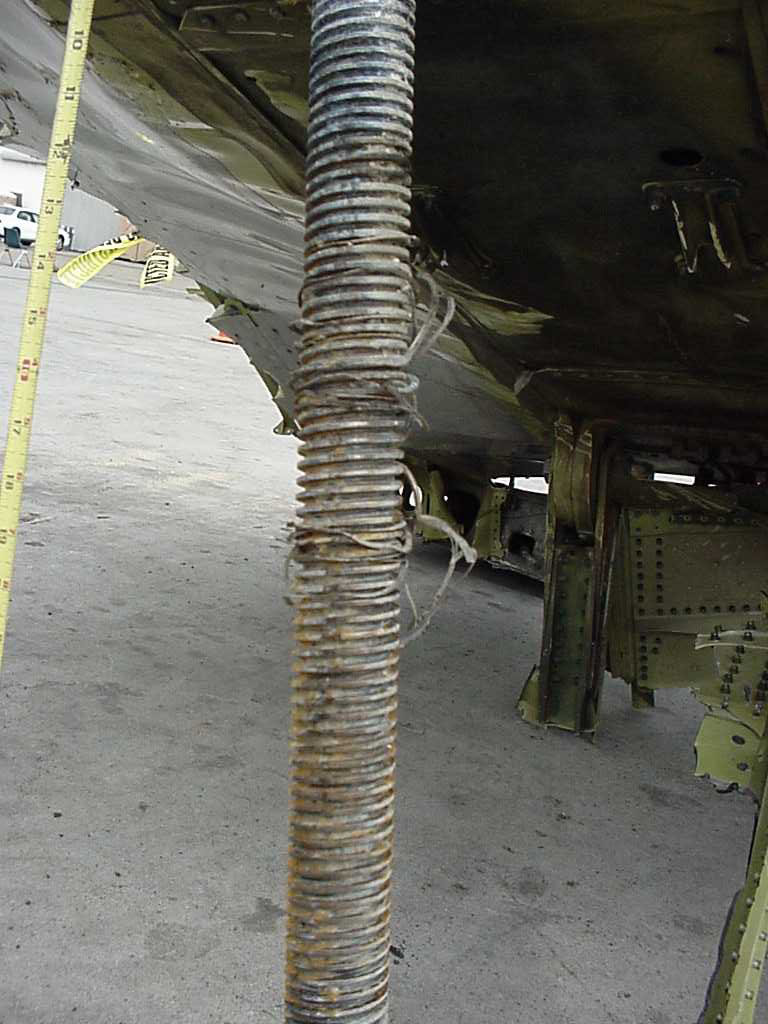
The jackscrew from Alaska Airlines Flight 261 recovered after the crash

- Alaska Airlines Flight 261 took off from Mexico en route to California. The MD-83 had been in maintenance, and the T-tail's jackscrew had not been checked as called for in the maintenance schedule. After several tries, the crew was able to unfreeze the stabilizer, and the airplane pitched downward into a dive. The pilots were able to recover and were preparing to divert to Los Angeles when the tail broke loose from its assembly. The plane pitched over again 70 degrees nose down, rolling inverted as it fell. The pilots attempted to control the aircraft while inverted to no avail; 86 seconds later the aircraft hit the Pacific Ocean nose first and broke up on impact with the water, killing everyone on board.
- Aeroflot Flight 4225 took off from Almaty International Airport en route to Simferopol Airport. The Tupolev aircraft had reached an altitude of no more than 500 feet and was in a zone of hot air. The plane entered a steep nosedive and stalled; the crew lost control and the plane crashed, killing 166 people.
- Asiana Airlines Flight 991 took off from Incheon International Airport for a night cargo flight to Shanghai Pudong International Airport on July 28, 2011. Almost halfway to its destination, the crew declared a cargo fire emergency and wanted to divert to Jeju Airport. The fire got much worse, and the plane became totally uncontrollable. The plane flew into the Pacific Ocean, killing the two pilots instantly.
- Air Midwest Flight 5481 took off from Charlotte/Douglas international airport to Greenville-Spartanburg international airport. The Beechcraft 1900D had its elevator range of motion cut to only 7 degrees downward but a full 14 degrees upward during a maintenance error, and was overweight. The plane took off from runway 18R with 21 passengers and crew. Right after the gear was raised, the plane pitched up and the crew lost control. The plane stalled and pitched downward into a steep dive. It crashed into a corner of an aircraft hangar, killing all 21 people aboard.
- United Airlines Flight 232 was a regularly scheduled United Airlines flight from Denver to Chicago, continuing to Philadelphia. On July 19, 1989, the DC-10 (registered as N1819U) serving the flight crash-landed at Sioux City, Iowa, after suffering a catastrophic failure of its tail-mounted engine, which led to the loss of many flight controls. At the time, the aircraft was en route from Stapleton International Airport to O'Hare International Airport. Of the 296 passengers and crew on board, 111 died in the accident and 185 survived, making the crash the fifth-deadliest involving the DC-10, behind Turkish Airlines Flight 981, American Airlines Flight 191, Air New Zealand Flight 901, and UTA Flight 772. Despite the deaths, the accident is considered a prime example of successful crew resource management because of the large number of survivors and the manner in which the flight crew handled the emergency and landed the airplane without conventional control.

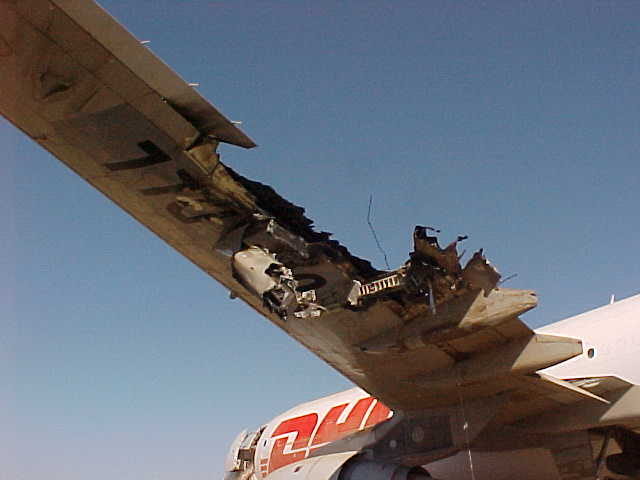
A damaged plane wing from the 2003 shootdown attempt

- 2003 Baghdad DHL attempted shootdown incident: On 22 November 2003, shortly after takeoff from Baghdad, Iraq, an Airbus A300B4-200F cargo plane, registered OO-DLL and owned by European Air Transport (doing business as DHL Express) was struck on the left wing tip by a surface-to-air missile while on a scheduled flight to Muharraq, Bahrain. Severe wing damage resulted in a fire and complete loss of hydraulic flight control systems. Returning to Baghdad, the three-man crew made an injury-free landing of the seriously damaged A300, using differential engine thrust as the only pilot input.
- Lion Air Flight 610 and Ethiopian Airlines Flight 302 suffered uncommanded nose-down inputs due to the Maneuvering Characteristics Augmentation System (MCAS) receiving erroneous data from the angle of attack (AOA) sensors. As a result, the Boeing 737 MAX 8 planes crashed shortly after takeoff, killing all 346 people on board both aircraft (189 on Lion Air Flight 610 and 157 on Ethiopian Airlines Flight 302).
