= Ermenonville Forest =

State-owned forest in Oise, France

Coordinates: 49°09′06″N 2°38′22″E

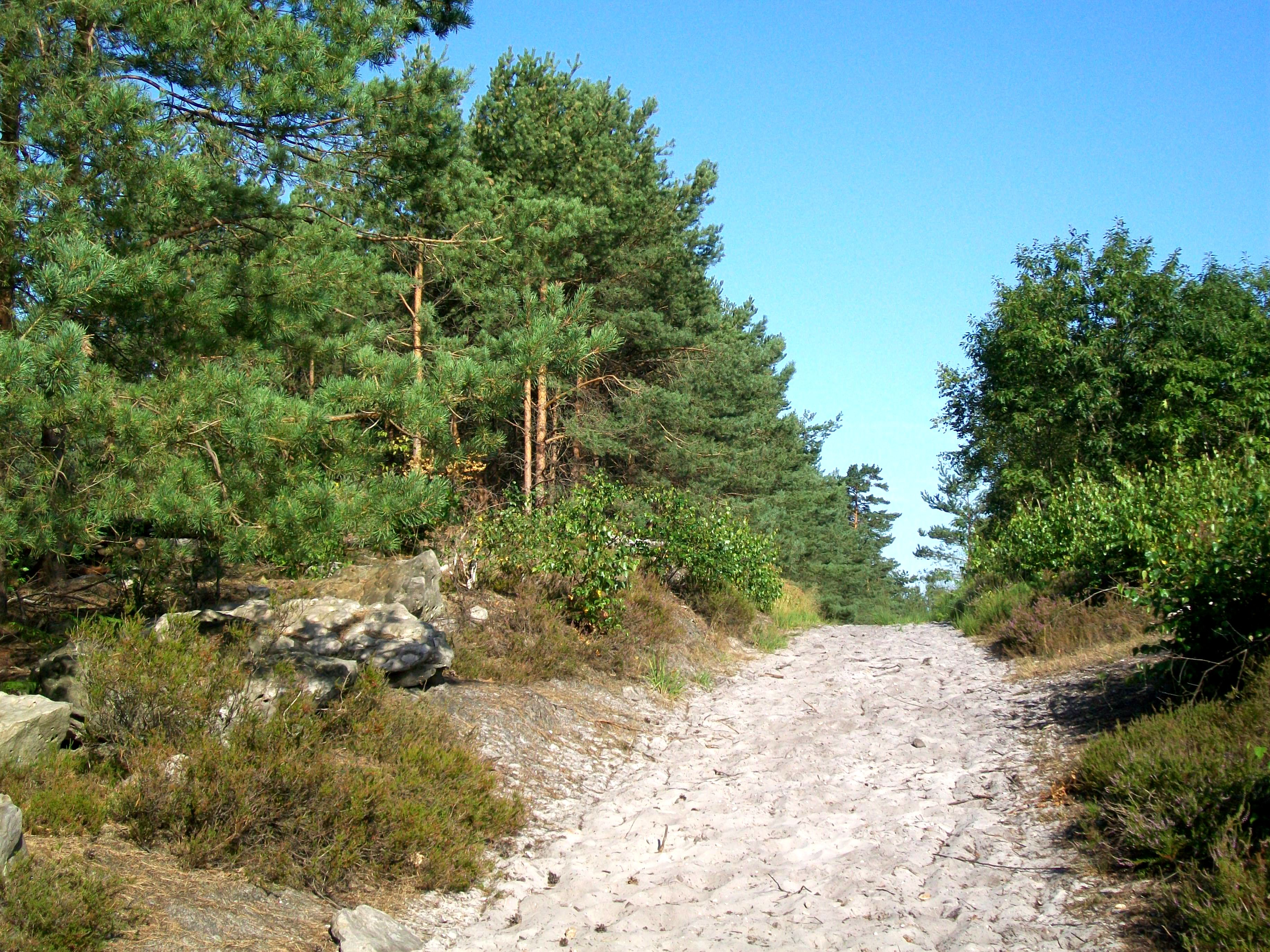
Haute-Chaume road near Carrefour crossroads, showing the area's sandy substrate and typical vegetation; Ermenonville Forest, Oise, France

The Ermenonville Forest (French: Forêt d'Ermenonville, pronounced [fɔʁɛ dɛʁmənɔ̃vil]) is a state-owned forest in Oise, France. With the Chantilly Forest and Forest of Halatte, it comprises the bulk of the Massif des Trois Forêts. The 3,319 hectares (12.81 sq mi) of the national forest itself is the core of a larger unit, made up of numerous privately owned forests including the Chaalis and Morrière woods, with a total area of 6,500 hectares (25 sq mi).

On 3 March 1974, Turkish Airlines Flight 981 crashed in the forest and in the commune of Fontaine-Chaalis, killing all 346 people on board. A memorial to the victims of the flight stands in the forest.

== Geography ==
The Ermenonville Forest is located in the northern Paris Basin and belongs to the Valois and Vielle France ecoregion as defined by the French National Forest Inventory. It extends to the Nonette river valley in the north; the Chantilly Forest and the A1 autoroute in the west; the Thève river valley, Mortefontaine, and Ermenonville in the south; and the Valois Plateau in the east. The national forest includes eight communes: Mont-L'Évêque, Borest, Fontaine-Chaalis, Montlognon, Baron, Ermenonville, Ver-sur-Launette, and Mortefontaine.

=== Topography and geology ===
The forest occupies hills ranging from 70 to 120 metres (230 to 390 ft) in altitude, and includes occasional shallow ponds and rivers. The forest floor is almost entirely sandy, with some sandstone and limestone strata and some areas of periglacial loess. In some areas, the sandstone has been eroded into tablelike formations or even chaotic rockpiles like those found in the Forest of Fontainebleau. Some such formations have names: the Pierre Sorcière (Witch Rocks), the Bruyères de Frais Vent (Fresh Air Heath), and the Grès Sainte-Marguerite (St. Margaret Sandstone).

=== Hydrography ===
Few watercourses cross the forest due to its sandy substrate. The main surface stream is the Launette, a tributary of the Nonette, which in turn joins the Oise. Human activity has created ponds on the Launette at the Ermenonville Park and at the level of the Chaalis abbey. Other ponds in the Vallière estate in Mortefontaine, which lies in the Thève watershed, inspired the painter Camille Corot.

== Transportation and communication ==
Several major roads, including the N 330 and A1 autoroutes, cross or border the Ermenonville Forest. No railway lines serve the forest itself; the Plessis-Belleville station is only 5 kilometres (3.1 mi) from Ermenonville, but no foot-accessible routes connect it to the town.

Several bus lines serve localities on the forest outskirts, including Senlis, Othis-Beapré, Beaumarchais, Plailly, and Pontarmé.

== History ==
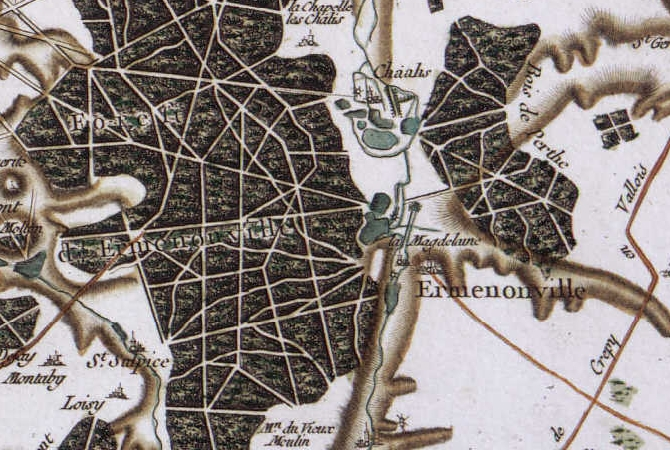
Cassini map of the forest

=== Church lands under the Ancien Régime ===
The oldest mentions of forest in the current unit's area date back to the founding of the Chaalis Abbey in 1136. King Louis VI granted the abbey the use, and later full ownership, of the surrounding woods. Other woods, in the south of the current area, were purchased by the abbey or donated by local lords in the 13th century. In 1641, an inventory of the abbey's lands included roughly 3,000 acres (1,200 ha) of woods, although that land mostly consisted of heathland and poor-quality groves, which funded the abbey mostly through grazing rights. Around this time, the forest's other primary owners were the Victoire Abbey, founded in 1225 near Senlis, which owned 200 acres (81 ha) between Senlis and Chaalis; the priory at Borest dependent on the Abbey of Saint Genevieve, which owned 280 acres (110 ha); and the bishop of Senlis, who owned 500 acres (200 ha) around his summer residence at Mont-L'Èvêque. Secular authorities owned little or none of the Ermenonville Forest. The ecclesiastical landowners were free to manage their woods without reference to the waters and forests of Senlis, unlike the Halatte and Chantilly Forests. However, several contemporary reports mention poor maintenance of these lands.

In the 17th century, the royal hunting captaincy of Halatte and Carnelle covered all of today's Ermenonville Forest. In the course of various royal land grants to various abbeys in the medieval period, the kings of France always reserved hunting rights, especially for large game. The princes of Condé, who held this captaincy from 1674, built a dense star-shaped route network, defined in the letters patent of 25 January 1718 and 30 November 1721.

=== Establishment of the national forest ===
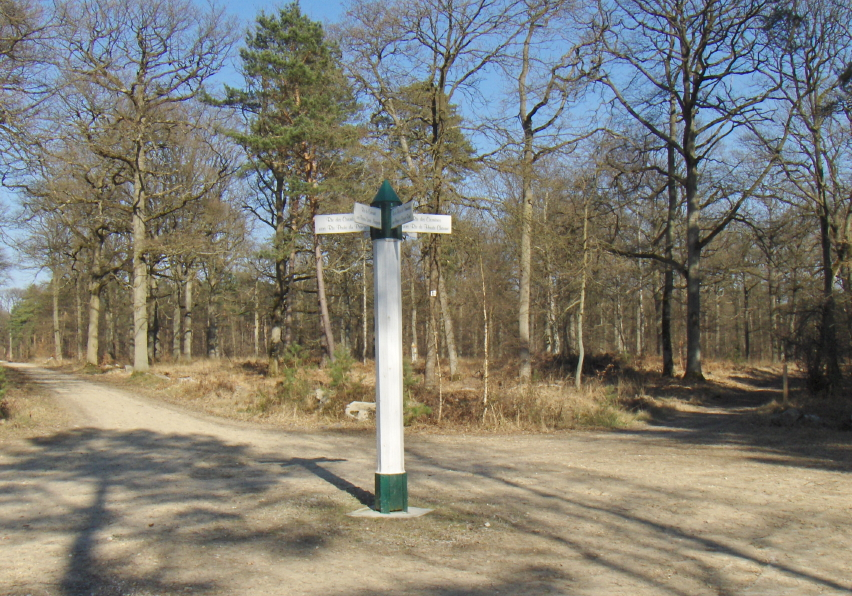
Danmartin Grove crossroads, in the middle of the forest

All church forest-lands were nationalized under the French Revolution. Together, they comprise a single forest unit of 6,000 hectares (15,000 acres). Under the First French Empire, they were divided between Joseph Bonaparte, who owned the southern part near his domain at Mortefontaine, and François Christophe de Kellermann, who acquired the eastern part near his domain at the Fontaine-Chaalis chateau. Another part was returned to the lords of Ermenonville after the fall of the Empire. Under the Restoration, the remainder was made a national forest. Until then, the forest's territory consisted of fragmentary woods surrounded by moors and heathlands used for grazing. In 1825, the water and forestry administration began replanting these gaps with Scots pine and maritime pine, although the maritime pines were mostly killed off by the winter frosts of 1879-1880.

In June 1940, a forest fire burned over 800 hectares (2,000 acres) of the forest, one of the most serious disasters in its history. The previous March, a tornado had caused more significant damage, as did large-scale sampling for military use during World War II.

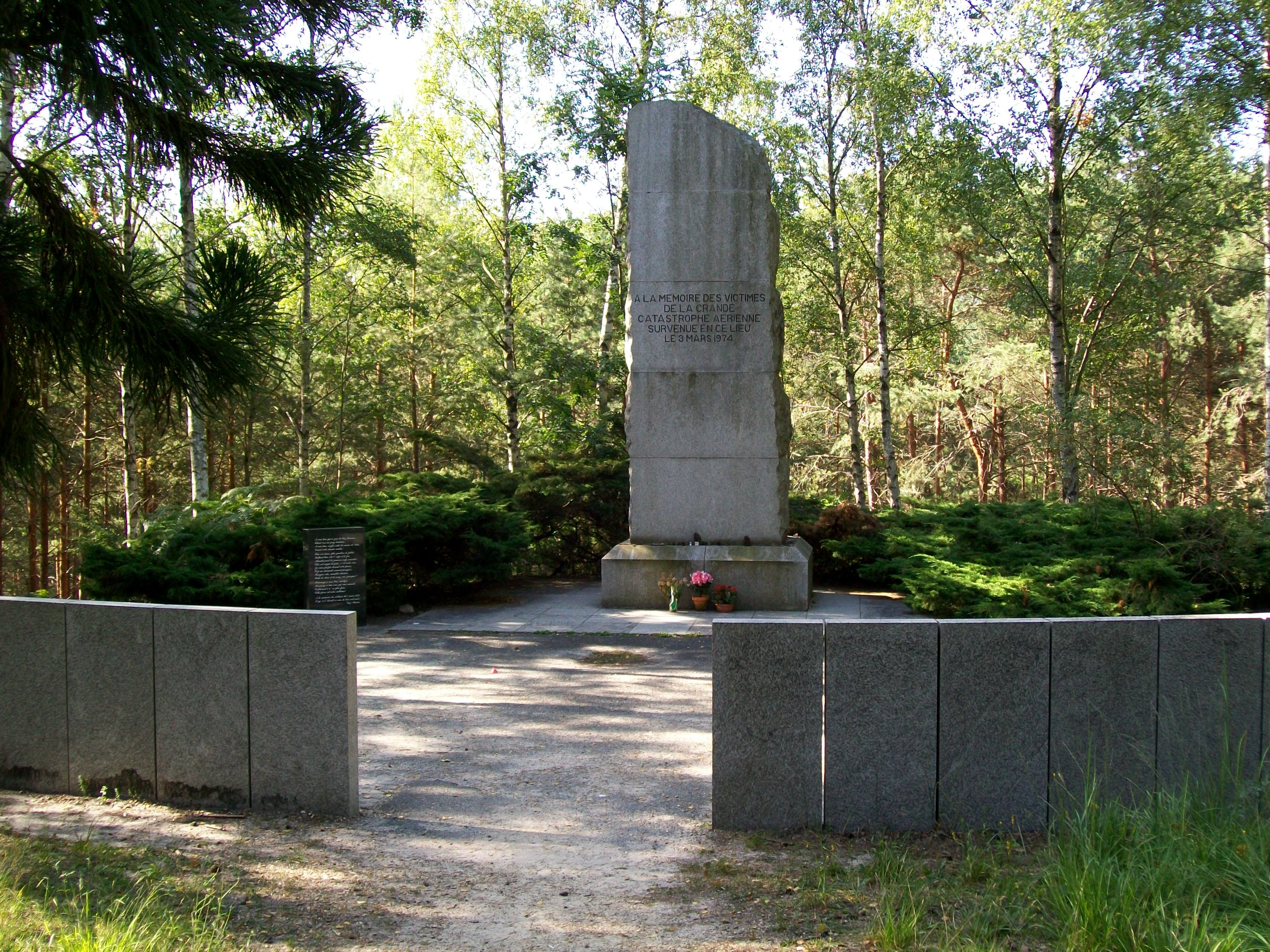
Memorial for the Flight 981 accident victims

On 3 March 1974, a McDonnell Douglas DC-10 operating Turkish Airlines Flight 981 crashed in the Ermenonville Forest after its rear baggage door opened in mid-flight, explosively decompressing the aircraft and causing total loss of control, killing all 346 passengers and crew. At the time, this was the deadliest ever plane crash. Today, a monument to the victims of the Ermenonville air disaster stands near the accident site.

== Forest management and silviculture ==
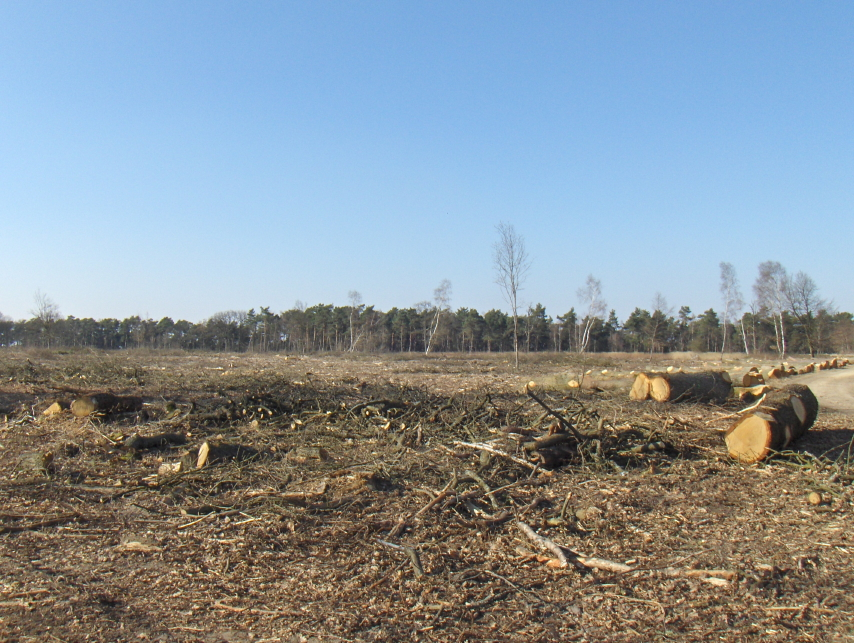
Plot 163 after a clear-cut

The Ermenonville Forest is managed by the National Forestry Office (ONF)'s Trois Forêts unit office, based out of Chantilly, which is responsible for implementing the current (2000-2014) forest management plan.

The national forest is largely composed of Scots pine (43% surface area, 1412 ha) and oaks (1434 ha), mixed with small amounts of beech (105 ha, 3% of the forest) and alder (4 ha). For a long time, the forest was treated half as deciduous coppiced forest and half as coniferous high forest. In 1970, the ONF decided to convert the whole area to high forest. Six species have been selected as priority: sessile oak, Scots pine, chestnut, maritime pine, Corsican black pine, and common alder. The forest produces 15000–18000 m^{3} of PEFC-certified wood annually.

The forest of the Chaalis estate, owned by the Institut de France, is managed and forested by the ONF. A development plan was established for the 2001-2020 period. It includes three main types of plots: hardwood high forest, softwood high forest, and poplar groves. This forest produces 1500 m^{3} of wood annually.

Due to its dry sandy soils, heather undergrowth, and pine needle litter, the Ermenonville Forest is subject to frequent wildfires. To limit fire spread, the forest roads have been laid out for accessibility to emergency vehicles and are wide enough to serve as firebreaks; red oaks have been planted along the edges of resinous conifer plots; and the ONF actively removes fire-carrying undergrowth.

== Gallery ==
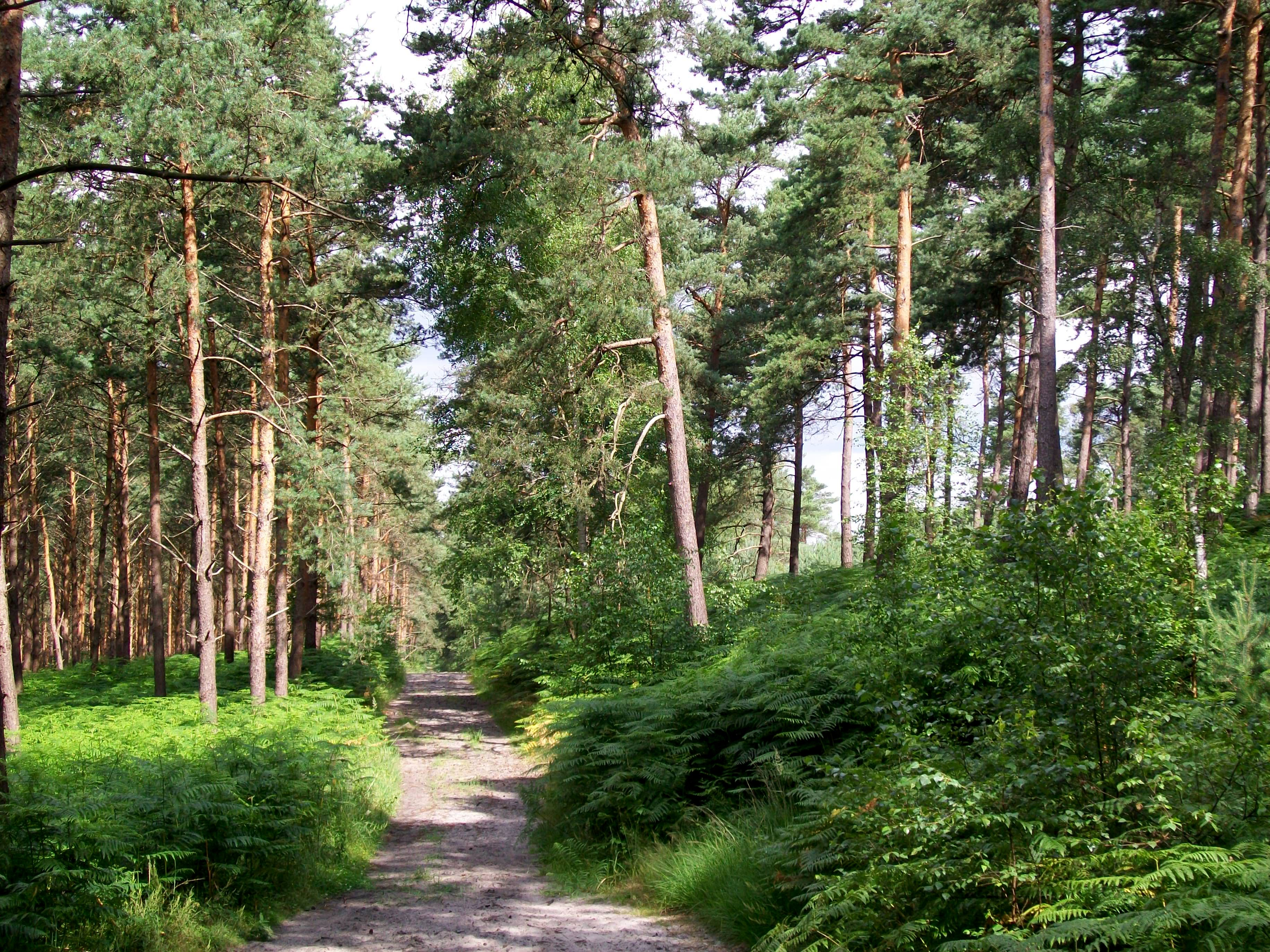
Scots pine and ferns are ubiquitous in the central part of the forest (here, the GR 1 near the Sycomore crossroads).

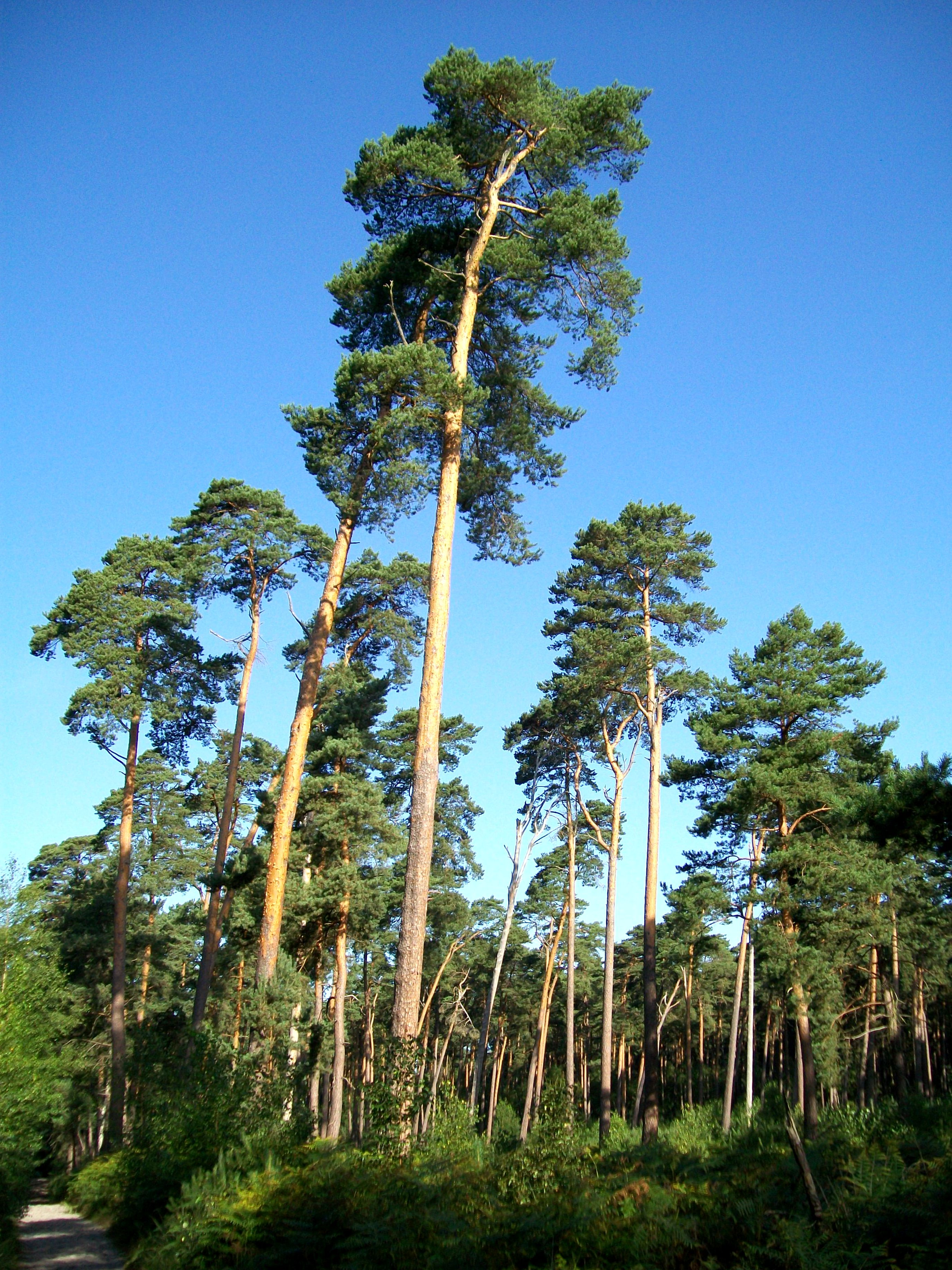
Scots pine high forest at the west edge of the national forest.

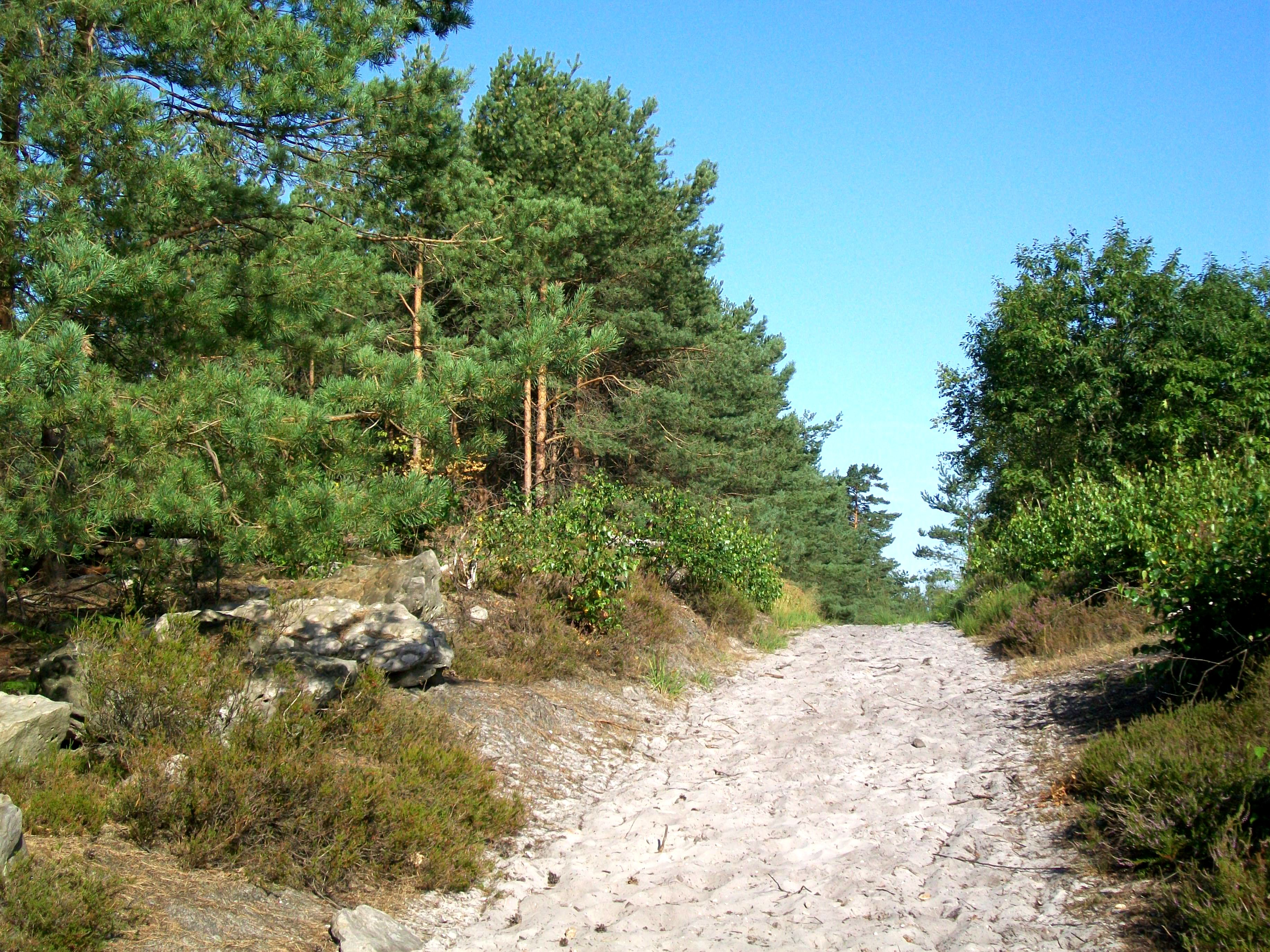
The forest has low topographical relief but is dotted with small hills in several areas. Its sandy substrate and its vegetation contribute to a Mediterranean ambience.

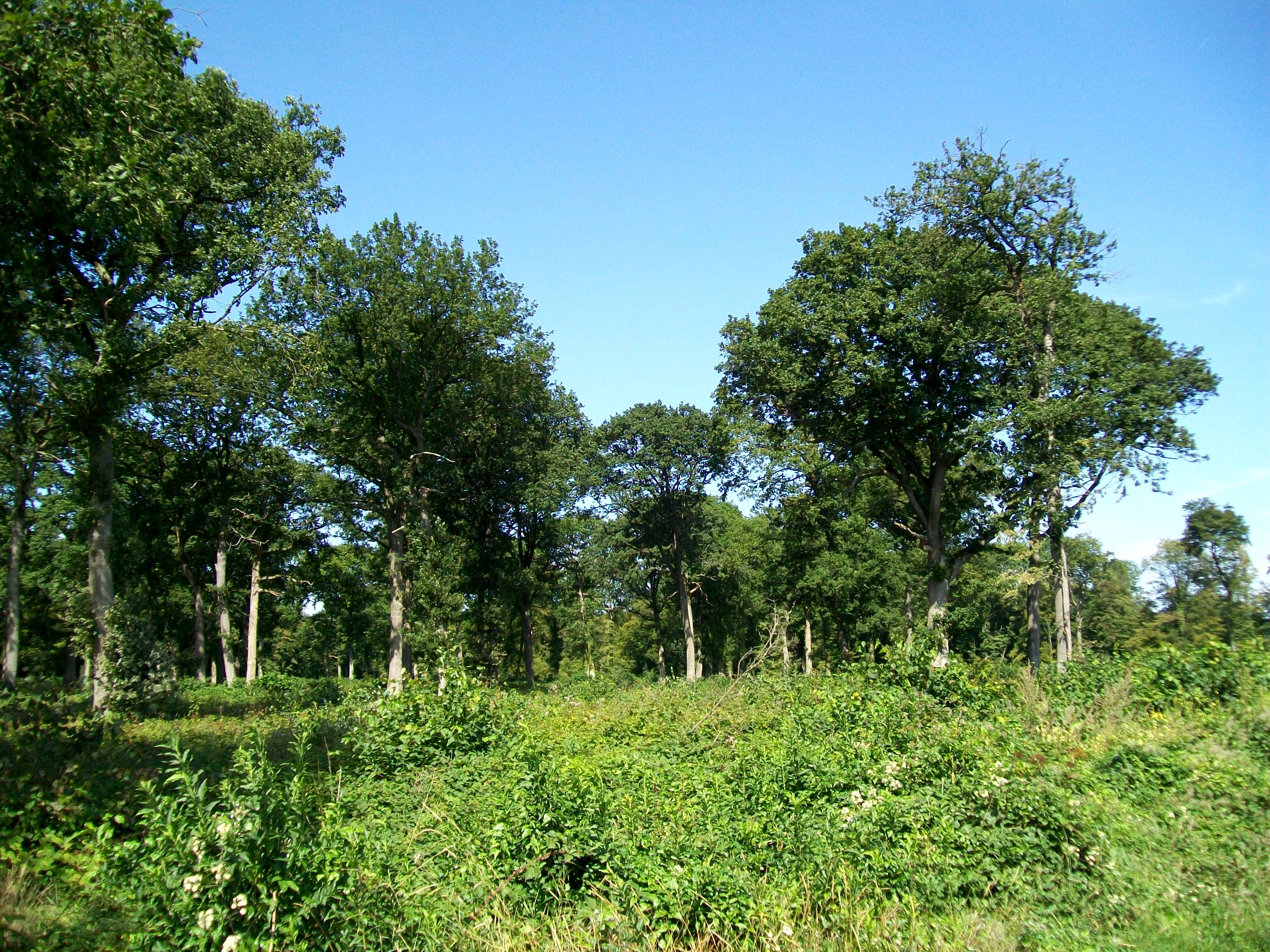
In the Bois de Perthe, deciduous trees are much more common than in the main forest unit. Here, an oak forest to the east of the wood, near Montagny-Sainte-Félicité.

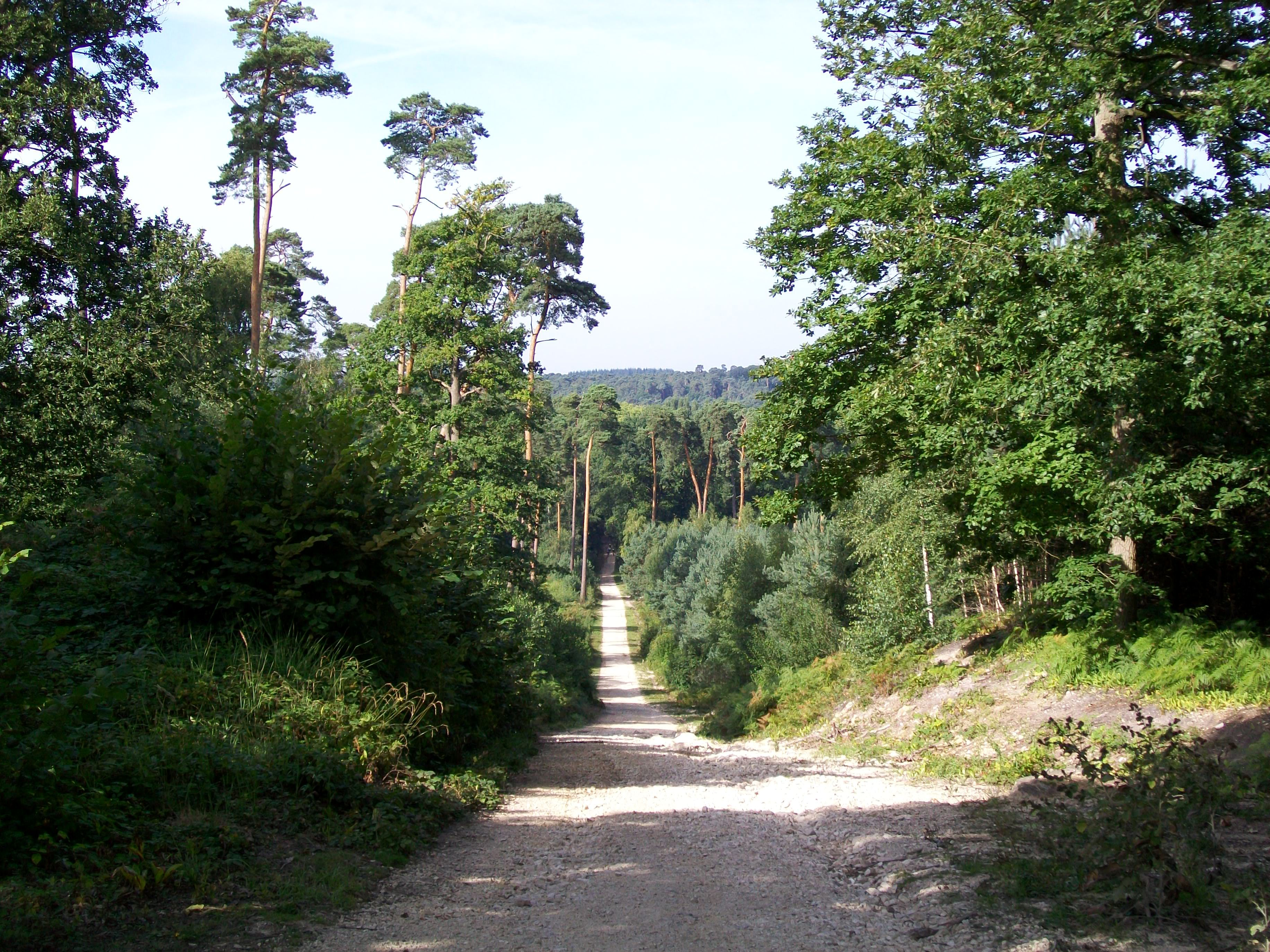
The Bois de Perthe has much greater topographical relief than that of the rest of the forest; here, the Regard route between the Perthe post and the Desert.

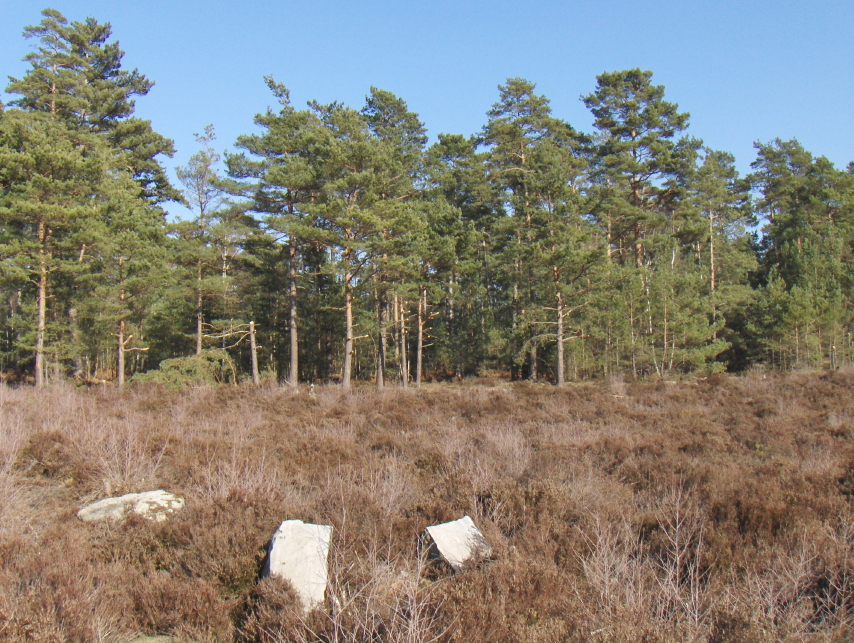
Moorland and Scots pines in the national forest, north of Poteau Ste-Marguerite, plot 162

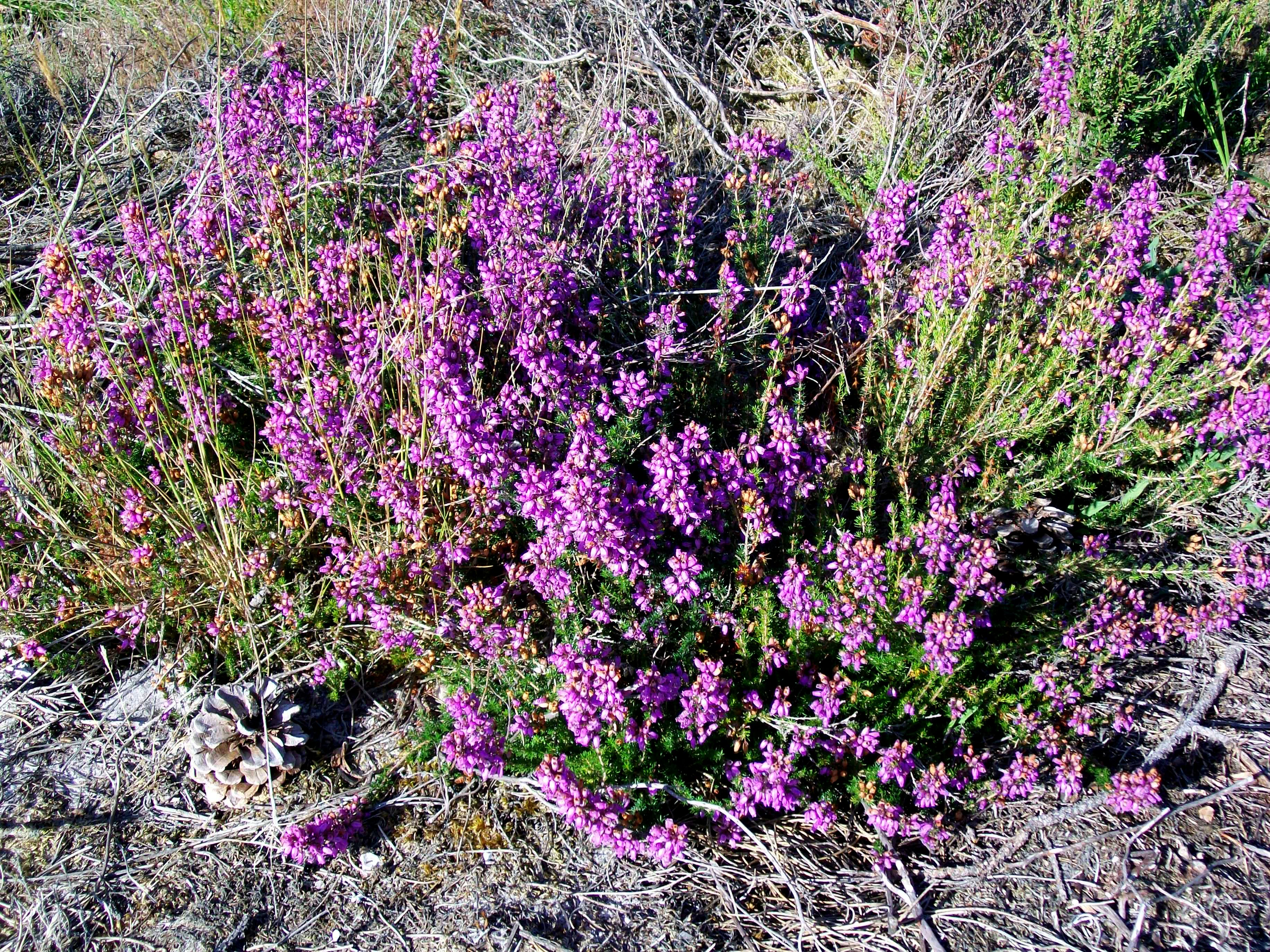
Bell heather, Haute-Chaume road, plot 130, in active restoration area

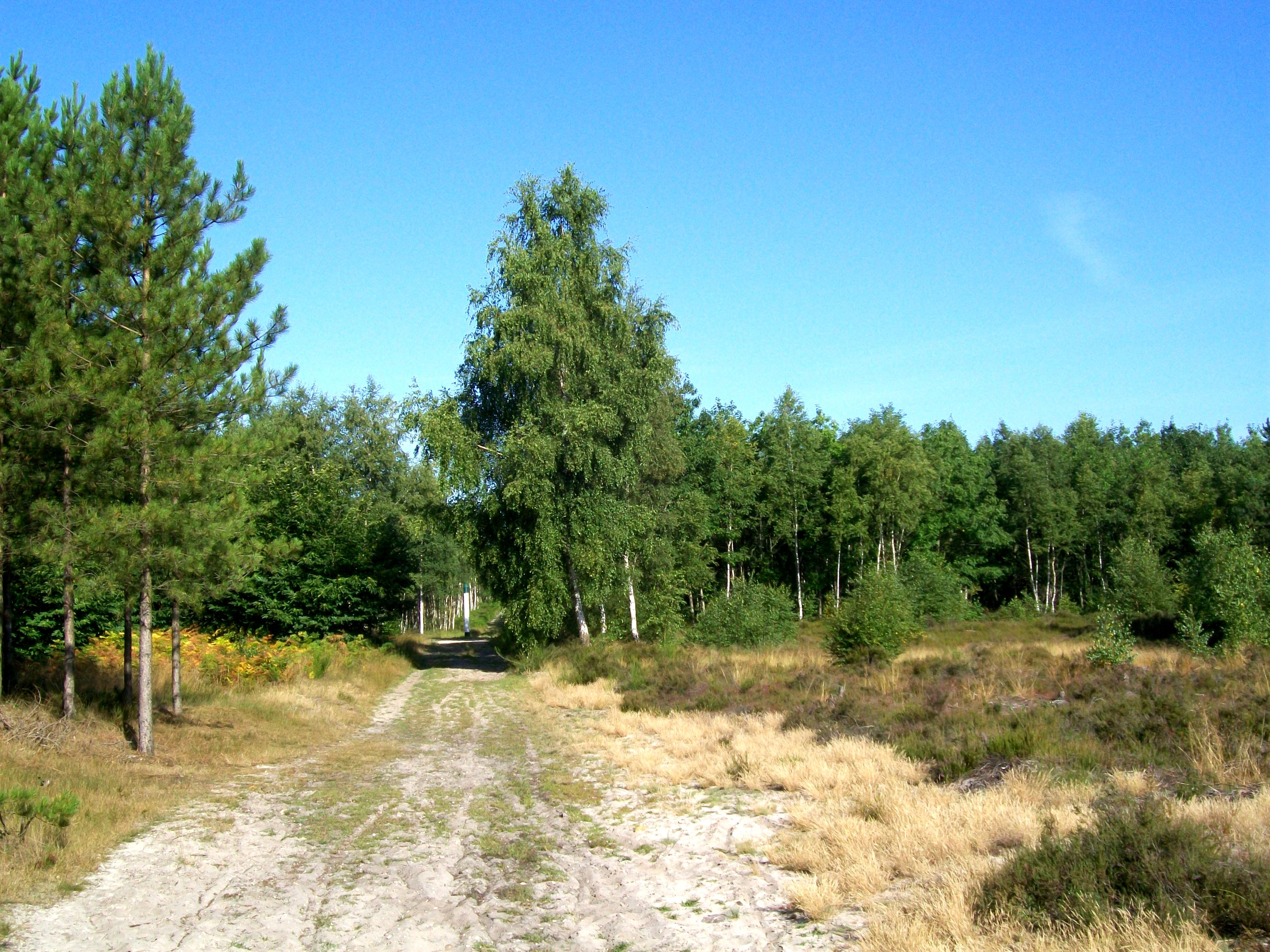
Haute-Chaume road between plots 131 and 141; in the background, the Haute-Chaume post. This is the main moorland area under restoration.

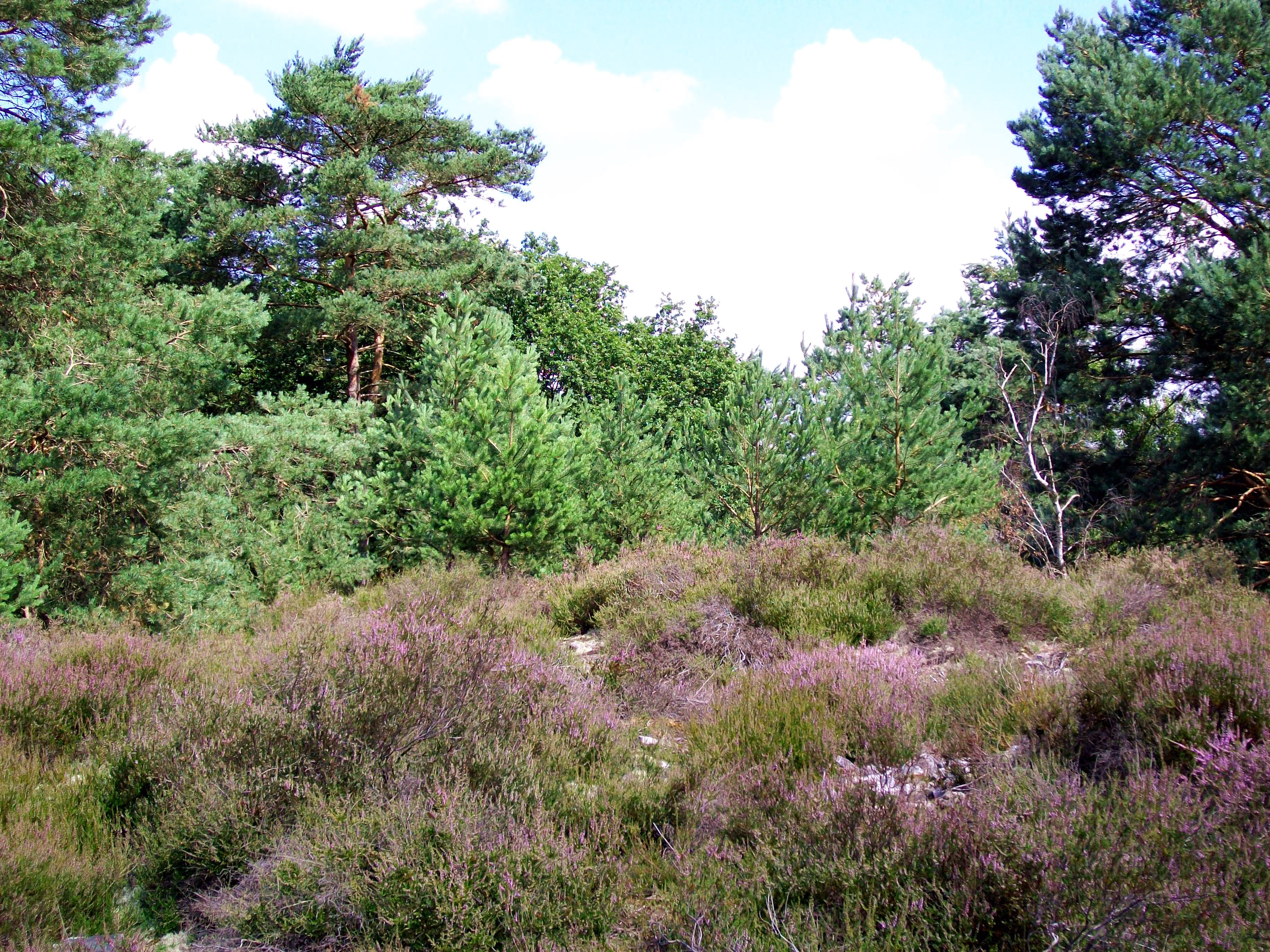
Moors in the Morrière woods, at the Pierre Monconseil site, Plailly.
