= Fillon government =

Fillon Government may refer to:

- First Fillon government, the French government under President Nicolas Sarkozy from May to June 2007
- Second Fillon government, the French government under President Nicolas Sarkozy from June 2007 to 2010
- Third Fillon government, the French government under President Nicolas Sarkozy from 2010 to 2012

== See also ==
- Cabinet of François Fillon
