= List of members of the European Parliament for Cyprus, 2024–2029 =

This is a list of the 6 members of the European Parliament for Cyprus in the 2024 to 2029 session. The members were elected in the 2024 European Parliament election in Cyprus.

== List ==
Name	Photograph	National Party	EP Group
Loukas Fourlas		Democratic Rally	EPP
Michalis Hatzipantelas		Democratic Rally	EPP
Giorgos Georgiou		Progressive Party of Working People	EUL–NGL
Fidias Panayiotou		Independent	NI
Geadis Geadi		ELAM	ECR
Costas Mavrides		Democratic Party	S&D

== Party Representation ==
National Party	EP Group	Seats	±
Democratic Rally	EPP	2 / 6	Steady
Progressive Party of Working People	EUL–NGL	1 / 6	▼1
Independent (Fidias Panayiotou)	NI	1 / 6	▲1
Democratic Party	S&D	1 / 6	Steady
ELAM	ECR	1 / 6	▲1
