= Oise's 4th constituency =

Constituency of the National Assembly of France

4th constituency of Oise
- inline Constituency of the National Assembly of France

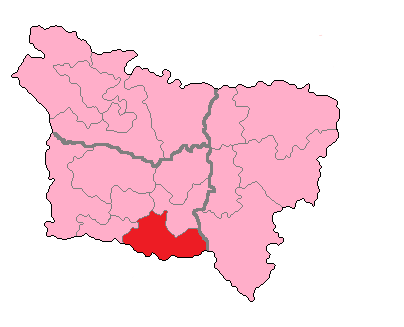
- Oise's 4th Constituency shown within Picardie
- Deputy: Éric Woerth; RE
- Department: Oise
- Cantons: Betz, Chantilly, Nanteuil-le-Haudouin, Pont-Sainte-Maxence, Senlis.
- Registered voters: 90,388

The 4th constituency of Oise is a French legislative constituency in the Oise département.

== Description ==
The 4th constituency of the Oise covers the south eastern corner of the department. It includes Parc Asterix.

From 1988 to 2017, the seat was held continuously by conservative deputies firstly Arthur Dehaine of the RPR, and since 2002 by Éric Woerth a former minister in the François Fillon governments. The seat was gained by LREM when Woerth defected to LREM.

== Historic Representation ==
Election	Member	Party
1986	Proportional representation – no election by constituency	
1988	Arthur Dehaine	RPR
1993	Arthur Dehaine	RPR
1997	Arthur Dehaine	RPR
2002	Éric Woerth	UMP
2007	Éric Woerth	UMP
2012	Éric Woerth	UMP
2017	Éric Woerth	LR
2022	Éric Woerth	RE

== Election results ==
=== 2024 ===
Legislative Election 2024: Oise's 4th constituency
Party	Candidate	Votes	%	±%
DVE	Noël Ngabissio	422	0.68	n/a
RE (Ensemble)	Éric Woerth	18,646	29.89	+2.89
LR	Jean Lefèvre	3,942	6.32	−7.02
LFI (NFP)	Mohamed Assamti	10,644	17.06	−0.61
LO	Caroline Dasini	422	0.68	n/a
REC	Jean-Claude Casas	772	1.24	−4.84
RN	Mathieu Grimpret	25,093	40.23	+16.08
DLF	Augusto Fernandes	280	0.45	n/a
DVC	Sophie Reynal	2,157	3.46	n/a
Turnout		62,378	97.90	+49.27
Registered electors		94,183		
2nd round result
RE	Eric Woerth	32,174	53.45	+23.56
RN	Mathieu Grimpret	28,026	46.55	+6.32
Turnout		60,200	95.33	−2.57
Registered electors		94,206		
RE hold		Swing		

=== 2022 ===
Legislative Election 2022: Oise's 4th constituency
Party	Candidate	Votes	%	±%
LREM (Ensemble)	Éric Woerth	12,044	27.00	-7.82
RN	Audrey Havez	10,772	24.15	+5.66
LFI (NUPÉS)	Mohamed Assamti	7,883	17.67	+4.63
LR (UDC)	Arnaud Dumontier	5,950	13.34	−14.34
REC	Laurent Meeschaert	2,713	6.08	N/A
LREM	Sophie Reynal*	2,583	5.79	N/A
PA	Thierry Bedossa	1,018	2.28	N/A
Others	N/A	1,639	-	−
Turnout		44,602	48.63	−0.55
2nd round result
LREM (Ensemble)	Éric Woerth	21,201	54.35	+6.33
RN	Audrey Havez	17,808	45.65	N/A
Turnout		39,009	45.52	+1.49
LREM gain from LR				

* LREM dissident, not supported by Ensemble Citoyens alliance.

=== 2017 ===
Candidate	Label	First round		Second round	
Candidate	Label	Votes	%	Votes	%
Stéphanie Lozano	REM	15,607	34.82	17,916	48.02
Éric Woerth	LR	12,407	27.68	19,396	51.98
Mylène Troszczynski	FN	8,287	18.49		
Martin Battaglia	FI	3,035	6.77		
Martine Bernard	ECO	1,605	3.58		
Caroline Brebant	PCF	1,206	2.69		
Luc Wilquin	ECO	823	1.84		
Anne Sébire	DLF	755	1.68		
Yann Leyris	DVD	444	0.99		
Véronique Dao Castes	DIV	343	0.77		
Caroline Dasini	EXG	314	0.70		
Votes		44,826	100.00	37,312	100.00
Valid votes		44,826	98.42	37,312	91.62
Blank votes		535	1.17	2,487	6.11
Null votes		184	0.40	926	2.27
Turnout		45,545	49.18	40,725	44.03
Abstentions		47,060	50.82	51,775	55.97
Registered voters		92,605		92,500	
Source: Ministry of the Interior

=== 2012 ===
Legislative Election 2012: Oise's 4th constituency
Party	Candidate	Votes	%	±%
UMP	Éric Woerth	20,518	40.17	
EELV	Patrick Canon	13,913	27.24	
FN	Mylène Troszczynski	10,608	20.77	
FG	Séverine Berger	2,593	5.08	
MoDem	Alexandre Babilotte-Baske	1,499	2.93	
Others	N/A	1,944		
Turnout		51,075	56.50	
2nd round result
UMP	Éric Woerth	27,069	59.23	
EELV	Patrick Canon	18,636	40.77	
Turnout		45,705	50.57	
UMP hold				

== Sources ==
Official results of French elections from 2002: "Résultats électoraux officiels en France" (in French).
