= Borest =

- Commune
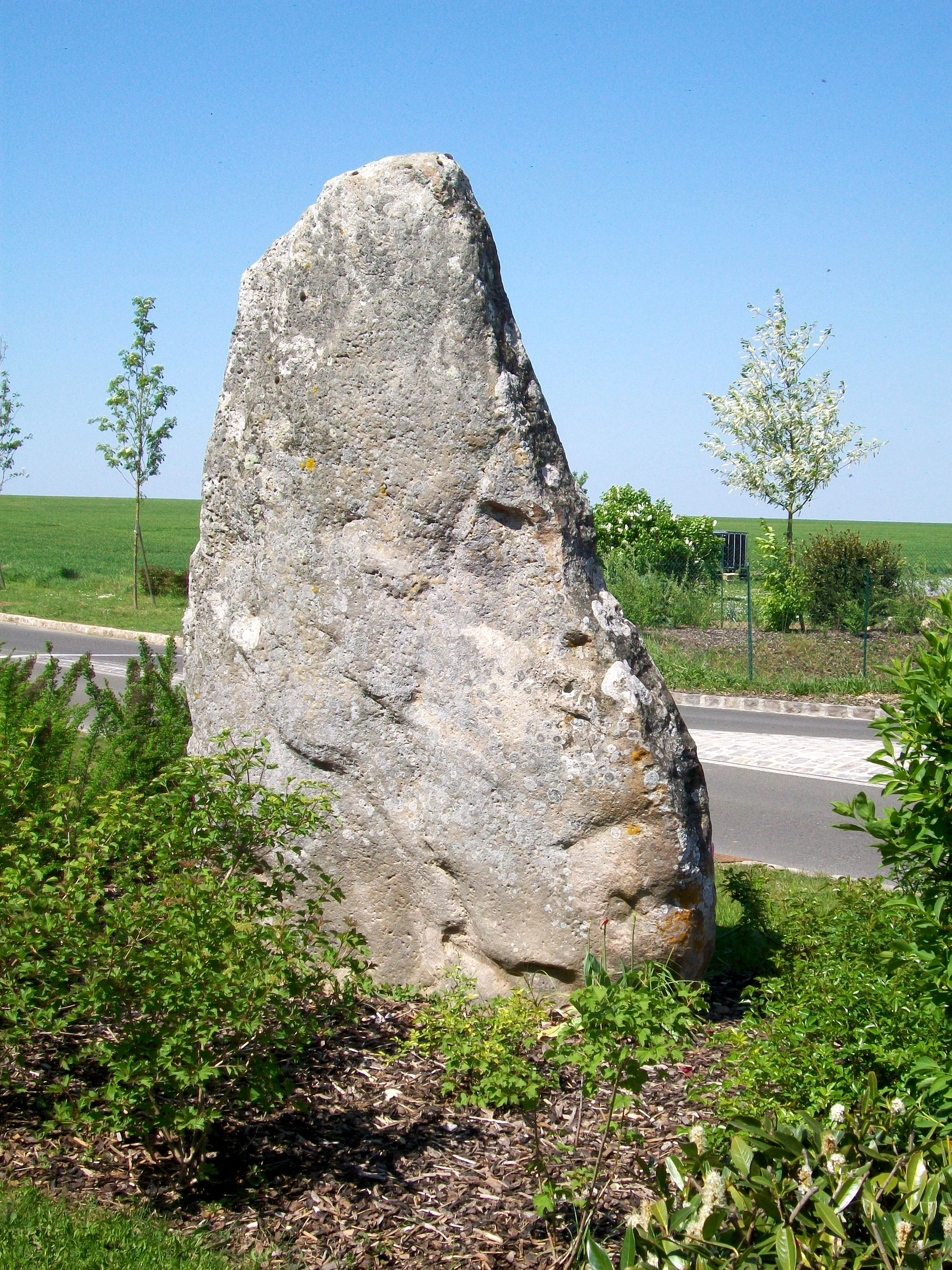
- The menhir known as Queue de Gargantua
- Location of Borest
- Location within France Location within Hauts-de-France
- Coordinates: 49°10′54″N 2°40′18″E
- Country: France
- Region: Hauts-de-France
- Department: Oise
- Arrondissement: Senlis
- Canton: Nanteuil-le-Haudouin

Government
  - Mayor (2020–2026): Bruno Sicard
- Area^{1}: 12.78 km^{2} (4.93 sq mi)
- Elevation: 96 m (315 ft)
- Highest elevation: 123 m (404 ft)
- Lowest elevation: 59 m (194 ft)
- Population (2023): 367
  - Density: 28.7/km^{2} (74.4/sq mi)
- Time zone: UTC+01:00 (CET)
  - Summer (DST): UTC+02:00 (CEST)
- INSEE/Postal code: 60087 /60300
- ^{1} French Land Register data, which excludes lakes, ponds, glaciers > 1 km^{2} (0.386 sq mi or 247 acres) and river estuaries.

Borest is a commune in the Oise department in northern France.

== Population ==
Historical population
Year	Pop.	±% p.a.
1968	295	—
1975	310	+0.71%
1982	271	−1.90%
1990	343	+2.99%
1999	326	−0.56%
2007	344	+0.67%
2012	337	−0.41%
2017	334	−0.18%
2023	367	+1.58%
Source: INSEE

== See also ==
- Communes of the Oise department
