= Éric Woerth =

French politician (born 1956)

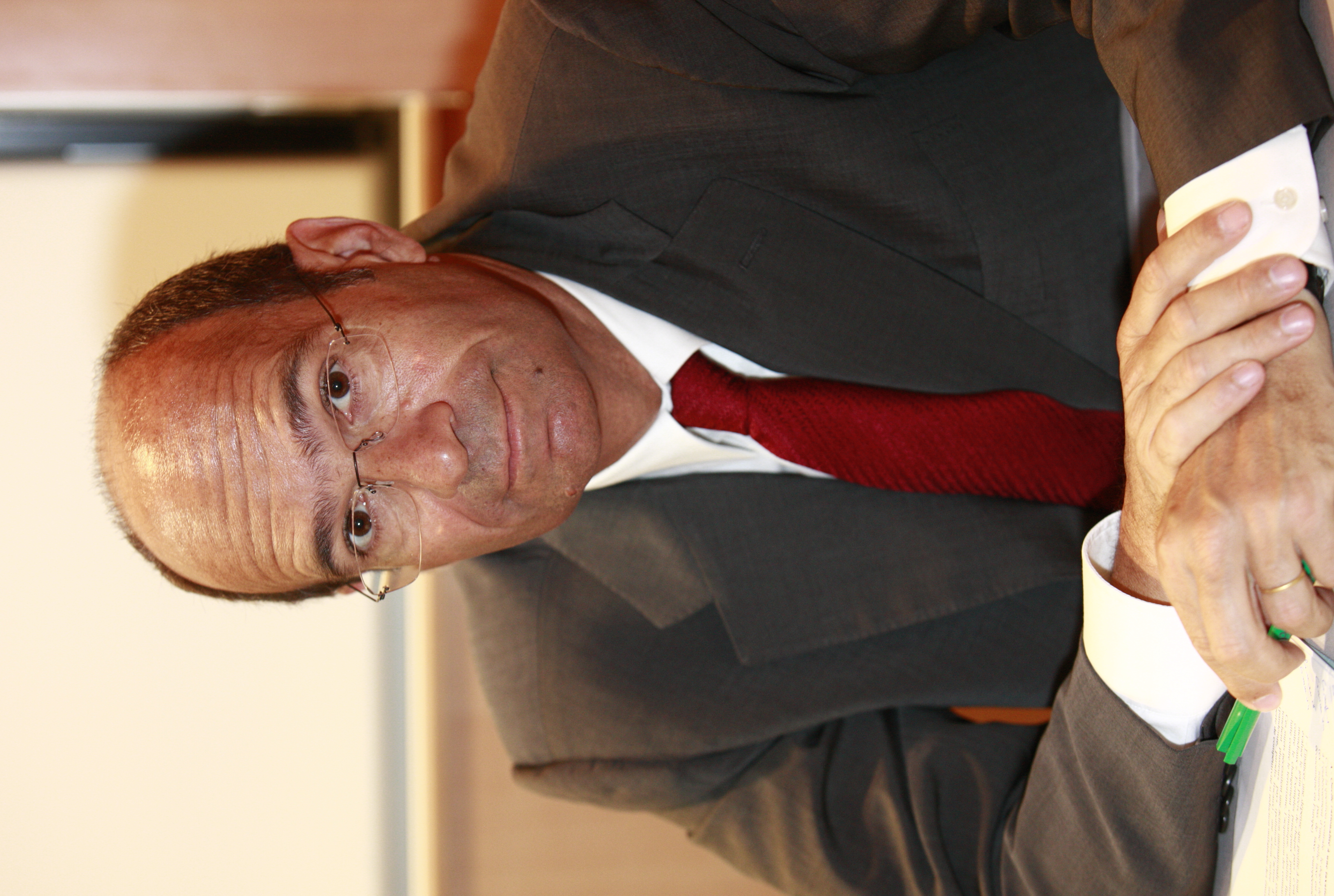
- Woerth in 2008

Minister for Territorial Development, Decentralization and Housing
- In office 5 October 2025 – 12 October 2025
- Prime Minister: Sébastien Lecornu
- Preceded by: François Rebsamen (Territorial Development and Decentralization); Valérie Létard (Housing)
- Succeeded by: Françoise Gatel (Regional Planning and Decentralization); Vincent Jeanbrun (Housing)

Member of the National Assembly
- In office 14 December 2010 – 1 March 2026
- Preceded by: Christian Patria
- Succeeded by: Véronique Ludmann
- Parliamentary group: UMP (2010-2022); LREM (since 2022)
- Constituency: Oise's 4th constituency
- In office 19 December 2005 – 19 July 2007
- Preceded by: Christian Patria
- Succeeded by: Christian Patria
- Parliamentary group: UMP
- Constituency: Oise's 4th constituency
- In office 19 June 2002 – 30 April 2004
- Preceded by: Christian Patria
- Succeeded by: Christian Patria
- Parliamentary group: UMP
- Constituency: Oise's 4th constituency

Quaestor of the National Assembly
- In office 29 June 2022 – 19 July 2024
- President: Yaël Braun-Pivet
- Preceded by: Laurianne Rossi
- Succeeded by: Christine Pirès-Beaune

Chairman of the Finance Committee of the National Assembly
- In office 29 June 2017 – 21 June 2022
- Preceded by: Giles Carrez
- Succeeded by: Éric Coquerel

Mayor of Chantilly
- In office 23 June 1995 – 6 July 2017
- Preceded by: Philippe Courboin
- Succeeded by: Isabelle Wojtowiez

Minister for Labor, Solidarity and the civil service
- In office 22 March 2010 – 13 November 2010
- President: Nicolas Sarkozy
- Prime Minister: François Fillon
- Preceded by: Xavier Darcos (Labor); Himself(civil service)
- Succeeded by: Xavier Bertrand (Labor); Roselyne Bachelot (Solidarity); François Baroin (civil service)

Minister for Budget, Public Accounts, the civil service, and State Reform (Note: State Reform added since June 23rd, 2009.)
- In office 18 May 2007 – 22 March 2010
- President: Nicolas Sarkozy
- Prime Minister: François Fillon
- Preceded by: Jean-François Copé
- Succeeded by: François Baroin

Secretary of State for State Reform
- In office 31 March 2004 – 31 May 2005
- President: Jacques Chirac
- Prime Minister: Jean-Pierre Raffarin
- Preceded by: Henri Plagnol
- Succeeded by: Jean-François Copé (indirectly)

Personal details
- Born: 29 January 1956 (age 70) Creil, France
- Party: Renaissance
- Spouse: Florence Henry
- Children: 2
- Education: Panthéon-Assas University; Sciences Po, HEC Paris

Éric Woerth (French pronunciation: [eʁik wœʁt]; born 29 January 1956) is a French politician of Renaissance who served in several positions in the government of Prime Minister François Fillon, including as Secretary of State for State Reform (2004–2005), as Minister for budget and public accounts (2007–2010) and briefly as Minister for Labor. In October 2025, he briefly served as Minister for territorial development, decentralization and housing in Prime Minister Sébastien Lecornu's government.

== Early life and education ==
Woerth was born in Creil, Oise. He studied at Paris 2 Panthéon-Assas University, HEC Paris and Sciences Po.

== Political career ==
=== Career in local politics ===
Municipal Council

Mayor of Chantilly : 1995-2004 (Resignation) / And since 2005. Reelected in 2001, 2005, 2008.

Deputy-mayor of Chantilly : 2004–2005.

Municipal councillor of Chantilly : Since 1995. Reelected in 2001, 2008.

Community of communes Council

President of the Communauté de communes of the aire cantilenne : Since 1995. Reelected in 2001, 2008.

Member of the Communauté de communes of the aire cantilienne : Since 1995. Reelected in 2001, 2008.

Vice-president of the Regional Council of Picardy : 1992–1998.

Regional councillor of Picardy : 1986-2002 (Resignation). Reelected in 1992, 1998.

=== Member of the National Assembly, 2002–2004 ===
Woerth was elected Deputy for Oise in 2002. In parliament, he served on the Finance Committee from 2002 until 2004.

In addition to his parliamentary work, Woerth was the treasurer of the UMP until he resigned in July 2010.

=== Career in government ===
Woerth was state secretary for state reform in the government of Prime Minister Jean-Pierre Raffarin from 2004 to 2005.

Woerth founded the "club de la boussole", a group of UMP députés, and is a member of the Réformateurs, a liberal trend within the UMP.

Woerth was the Minister for the Budget, Public Accounts and the Civil Service from 2007 until 2010, in the government of Prime Minister François Fillon. In this capacity, he oversaw French authorities obtaining Swiss bank account data amid a push to catch tax cheats.

Woerth later served as Minister of Labor, Solidarity and Civil Service from March until November 2010.

=== Member of the National Assembly, 2010–present ===
In parliament, Woerth served on the Committee on Foreign Affairs from 2010 until 2012 before moving to the Finance Committee in 2012. In addition to his committee assignments, he has been a member of the Franco-German Parliamentary Assembly since 2019.

In the Republicans' 2016 presidential primaries, Woerth endorsed François Fillon as the party's candidate for the office of President of France. In the Republicans' 2017 leadership election, he endorsed Laurent Wauquiez.

In July 2019, Woerth was one of the few LR members who abstained from a vote on the French ratification of the European Union's Comprehensive Economic and Trade Agreement (CETA) with Canada.

Together with Benjamin Dirx, Woerth published a non-legally binding report in 2019 which garnered international attention for its recommendations on preventing short-sellers and activists from unfairly destabilising French corporates. These included widening the disclosures of short positions to derivatives instruments, pushing for more transparency around the borrowing and lending of stock, and investigating whether market functions are jeopardised once short selling reaches a certain volume of shares.

Ahead of the 2022 presidential elections, Woerth publicly declared his support for incumbent Emmanuel Macron and criticized the Republicans’ candidate Valérie Pécresse.

Following the 2022 legislative election, Woerth stood as a candidate for the National Assembly's presidency; in an internal vote, he lost against Yaël Braun-Pivet.

== Legal difficulties ==
On 5 July 2010, following its investigations on the Liliane Bettencourt and Éric Woerth political controversy, the online newspaper Mediapart revealed a report where Claire Thibout, an ex-accountant working for Liliane Bettencourt, accused Nicolas Sarkozy and Woerth of receiving illegal campaign donations in 2007, in cash. The Canard enchaîné and Marianne weeklies later revealed that Woerth authorized the sale of the Compiegne racetrack to a group with close connections to the UMP, for a very low price and through an improper procedure. He was placed under formal investigation by the Cour de Justice de la République for that sale. All charges against him were dismissed in 2015.

He has been put under investigation in 2018 in the alleged Libyan financing in the 2007 French presidential election and in 2021 in the Bernard Tapie case.
