= Fontaine-Chaalis =

- Commune
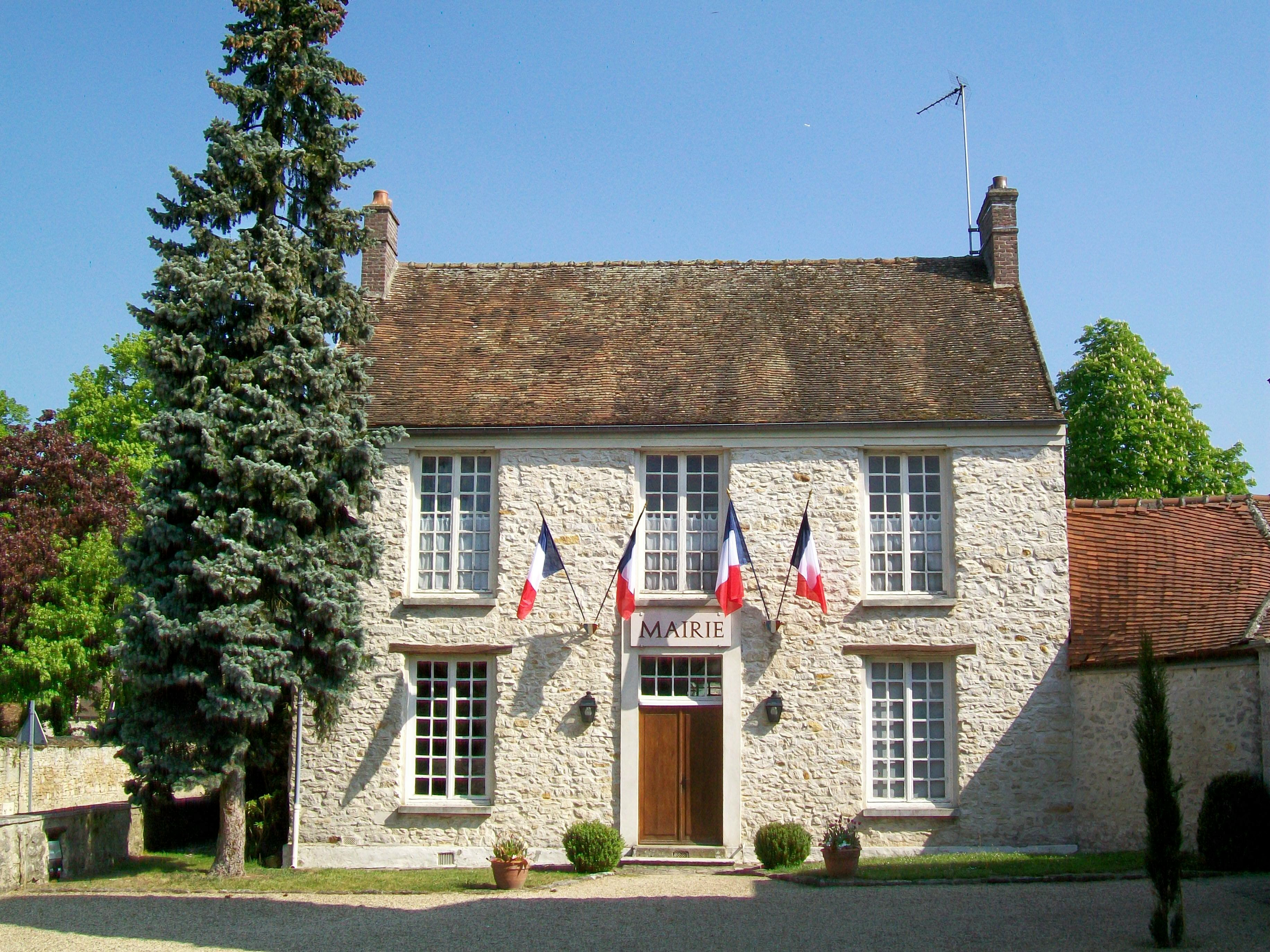
- The town hall in Fontaine-Chaalis
- Location of Fontaine-Chaalis
- Location within France Location within Hauts-de-France
- Coordinates: 49°10′19″N 2°41′03″E
- Country: France
- Region: Hauts-de-France
- Department: Oise
- Arrondissement: Senlis
- Canton: Nanteuil-le-Haudouin
- Intercommunality: Senlis Sud Oise

Government
  - Mayor (2020–2026): Alexis Patria
- Area^{1}: 33.11 km^{2} (12.78 sq mi)
- Elevation: 70 m (230 ft)
- Highest elevation: 123 m (404 ft)
- Lowest elevation: 62 m (203 ft)
- Population (2023): 318
  - Density: 9.60/km^{2} (24.9/sq mi)
- Time zone: UTC+01:00 (CET)
  - Summer (DST): UTC+02:00 (CEST)
- INSEE/Postal code: 60241 /60300
- ^{1} French Land Register data, which excludes lakes, ponds, glaciers > 1 km^{2} (0.386 sq mi or 247 acres) and river estuaries.

Fontaine-Chaalis (French pronunciation: [fɔ̃tɛn ʃali]) is a commune in the Oise department in northern France.

On 3 March 1974, Turkish Airlines Flight 981, a McDonnell Douglas DC-10, crashed within the political boundaries of the commune, in the state-owned Ermenonville Forest.

== See also ==
- Communes of the Oise department
- Chaalis Abbey
