= Turkish Airlines Flight 981 =

1974 aviation accident in France

Ermenonville air disaster Turkish Airlines Flight 981
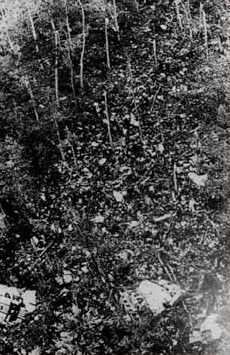
- Debris field of the aircraft

Accident
- Date: 3 March 1974
- Summary: Cargo door failure due to design flaw leading to explosive decompression and loss of control
- Site: Ermenonville Forest Fontaine-Chaalis, Oise, France; 49°08.5′N 002°38′E

Aircraft
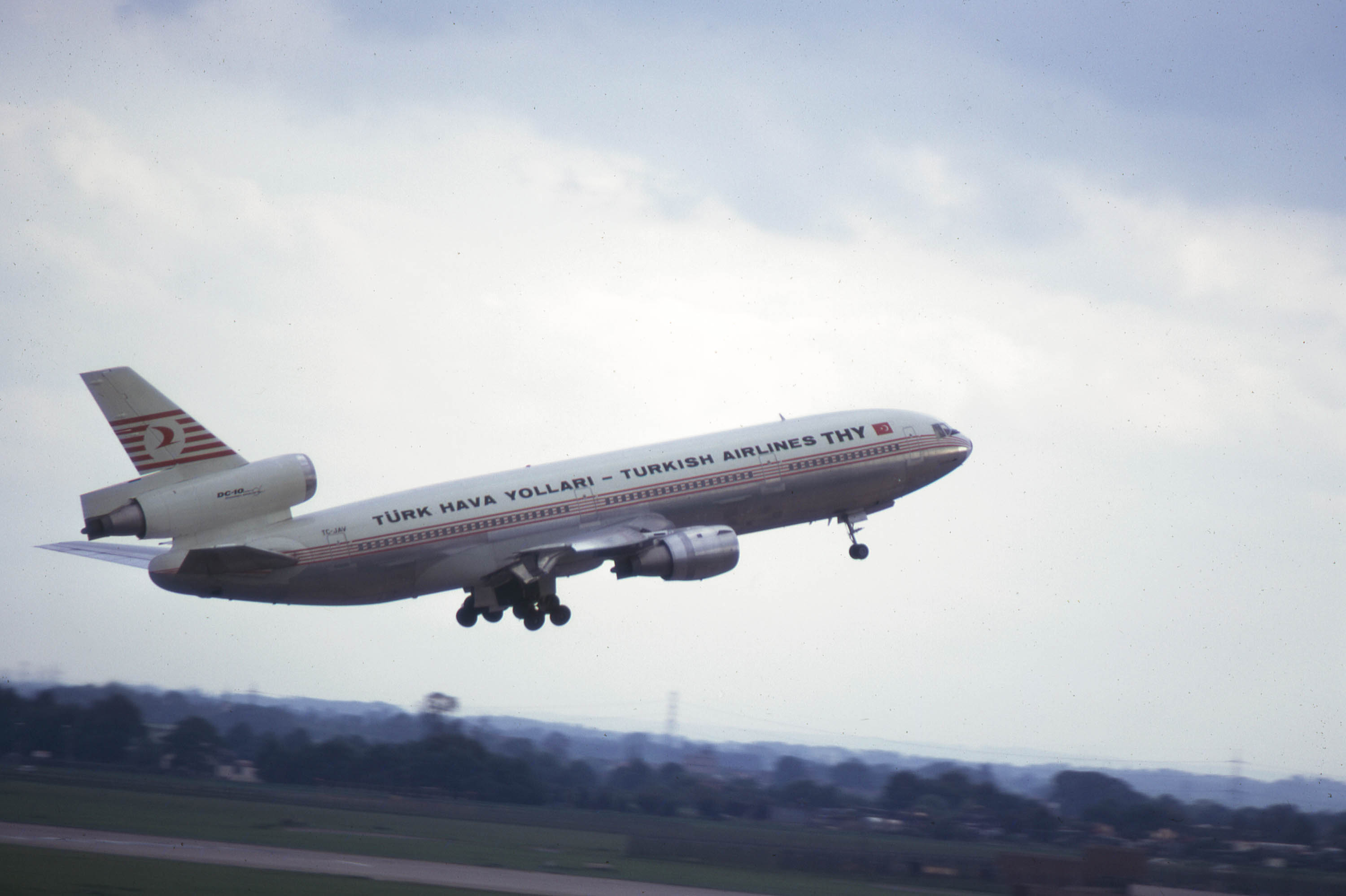
- TC-JAV, the aircraft involved in the accident, photographed in 1973
- Aircraft type: McDonnell Douglas DC-10-10
- Aircraft name: Ankara
- Operator: Turkish Airlines
- IATA flight No.: TK981
- ICAO flight No.: THY981
- Call sign: TURKISH 981
- Registration: TC-JAV
- Flight origin: Yeşilköy Airport; Istanbul, Turkey
- Stopover: Orly Airport; Paris, France
- Destination: London Heathrow Airport; London, United Kingdom
- Occupants: 346
- Passengers: 335
- Crew: 11
- Fatalities: 346
- Survivors: 0

Turkish Airlines Flight 981 was a scheduled flight from Istanbul Yeşilköy Airport to London Heathrow Airport, with an intermediate stop at Orly Airport in Paris. On 3 March 1974, the McDonnell Douglas DC-10 operating the flight crashed into the Ermenonville Forest, about 40 kilometres (25 mi; 22 nmi) outside Paris, killing all 335 passengers and 11 crew. The crash was also known as the Ermenonville air disaster.

Flight 981 was the deadliest accident in aviation history until 27 March 1977, when 583 people died in the Tenerife airport disaster involving two 747 jets. It remains the deadliest single-aircraft accident without survivors, the deadliest accident involving the McDonnell Douglas DC-10, the deadliest accident in the history of Turkish Airlines, and the deadliest aviation accident to occur in France.

== Aircraft and crew ==
The aircraft, a DC-10 Series 10 (production designation Ship 29), was built in Long Beach, California, under the manufacturer's test registration N1337U.

The aircraft had 12 six-abreast first-class seats and 333 nine-abreast economy seats, for a total of 345 passenger seats. At the time of the accident, two people were seated in first class, while the economy class was fully occupied. The cockpit crew was Turkish. Flight 981's captain, Nejat Berköz, age 44, with 7,000 flying hours. First Officer Oral Ulusman, age 38, had 5,600 hours of flying time. Flight Engineer Erhan Özer, age 37, had 2,120 flying hours experience.

== Accident ==
Flight 981 departed from Istanbul at 07:57 local time and landed at Paris's Orly International Airport at 11:02 am local time, after a flight time of just over four hours. The aircraft was carrying 167 passengers and 11 crew members on its first leg, and 50 of these passengers disembarked in Paris. The flight's second leg, from Paris to London Heathrow Airport, was normally underbooked; however, due to a strike by British European Airways employees, and the indecisive result of the general election held in Britain earlier that week, many London-bound travelers, who had been stranded at Orly, were booked onto Flight 981, delaying the flight's departure by 30 minutes.

The aircraft left Orly Airport at 12:32, bound for Heathrow Airport, and took off in an easterly direction, before turning north. Shortly after takeoff, Flight 981 was cleared to flight level 230 (23,000 feet or 7,000 m) and started turning west towards London. Just after the aircraft passed over the town of Meaux, the rear left cargo door blew off and the sudden difference in air pressure between the cargo area and the pressurised passenger cabin above it, which amounted to 36 kPa (5.2 psi; 0.36 atm), caused a section of the cabin floor above the open hatch to separate and be forcibly ejected through the open hatch, along with six occupied passenger seats attached to that floor section. The fully recognisable bodies of the six Japanese passengers who were ejected from the aircraft along with the rear cargo door were found in a turnip field near Saint-Pathus, approximately 15 kilometres (9 miles; 8 nautical miles) south of the crash site. An air traffic controller noted that, as the flight was cleared to FL230, he had briefly seen a second echo on his radar that remained stationary behind the aircraft; this was likely the remains of the rear cargo door.

When the door blew off, the primary as well as both sets of backup control cables that ran beneath the section of floor that blew out were completely severed, destroying the pilots' ability to control the plane's elevators, rudder, and number two engine. The flight data recorder showed that the throttle for engine two snapped shut when the door failed.

The aircraft almost immediately attained a 20-degree pitch down and began picking up speed, while Captain Berköz and First Officer Ulusman struggled to regain control. At some point, one of the crew members pressed their microphone button broadcasting the pandemonium in the cockpit on the departure frequency. Controllers also picked up a distorted transmission from the plane and the aircraft's pressurisation and overspeed warnings were heard over the pilots' words in Turkish, such as the co-pilot saying, "the fuselage has burst!" or "the cabin blew out!" As the plane's speed increased, the additional lift raised the nose again. An unknown voice was recorded calling out, "Speed!" and engine power was increased in order to level off. Seventy-seven seconds after the cargo door gave way, the plane crashed into the trees of Ermenonville Forest, a state-owned forest at Dammartin's Grove (French: Bosquet de Dammartin) in the commune of Fontaine-Chaalis, Oise. At the point of impact, the aircraft was traveling at a speed of approximately 783 kilometres per hour (487 mph; 423 kn; 218 m/s) at a slight left turn, fast enough to disintegrate the plane into thousands of pieces. The wreckage was so fragmented that it was difficult to determine whether any parts of the aircraft were missing before it crashed. Post-crash fires were small because there were few large pieces of the aircraft left intact to burn. Of the 346 passengers and crew on board, only 188 bodies were identifiable (40 of which were identified visually), with rescue teams recovering some 20,000 body fragments in all.

== Passengers ==
People on board by nationality
Nation	Passengers	Crew	Number
Argentina	3	0	3
Australia	2	0	2
Belgium	1	0	1
Brazil	5	0	5
Cyprus	1	0	1
France	16	0	16
Germany	1	0	1
India	2	0	2
(Republic of Ireland) Ireland	1	0	1
Japan	48	0	48
Morocco	1	0	1
New Zealand	1	0	1
Pakistan	1	0	1
Senegal	1	0	1
Spain	1	0	1
Sweden	1	0	1
Switzerland	1	0	1
Turkey	45	11	56
United Kingdom	177	0	177
United States	25	0	25
Vietnam	1	0	1
Total	335	11	346

There were 167 passengers on the Istanbul to Paris leg, and 50 of them disembarked in Paris and 216 new passengers, many of whom were supposed to fly on Air France, British European Airways, or Pan Am, boarded TK 981 in Paris, resulting in a 30-minute departure delay.

The majority of the passengers were French, Turkish, Japanese, British, and American, including members of an amateur rugby team from Bury St Edmunds, Suffolk, who were returning from a Five Nations match between France and England. Notable deaths on board were Briton John Cooper, who won silver medals in the men's 400 meters hurdles and the 4 × 400 meters relay at the 1964 Summer Olympics in Tokyo, and Jim Conway, general secretary of the British Amalgamated Engineering and Electrical Union. There were also a number of journalists on the flight who were returning home from covering the France v England match in the Five Nations.

== Investigation ==
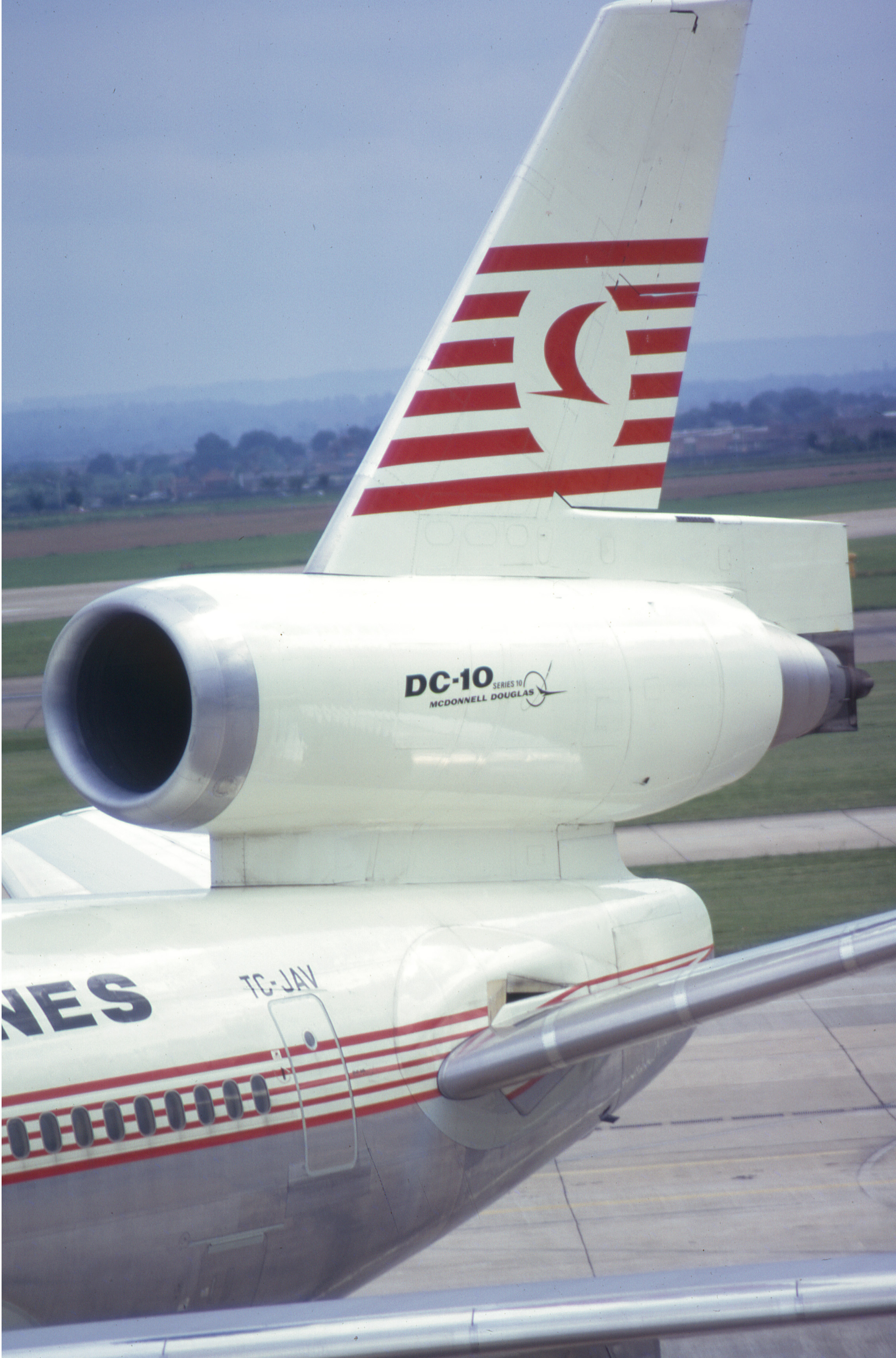
The aircraft's rear fuselage; visible at lower left is the cargo door that blew out.

The French Minister of Transport appointed a commission of inquiry by the Arrêté 4 March 1974 and included Americans because the aircraft was manufactured by an American company. There were many passengers on board from Japan and the United Kingdom, so observers from those countries followed the investigation closely.

The Lloyd's of London insurance syndicate that covered Douglas Aircraft retained Failure Analysis Associates (now Exponent, Inc.) to also investigate the accident. In the company's investigation, it was noted that during a stop in Turkey, ground crews had filed the cargo door's locking pins down to less than a quarter of an inch (6.4 millimetres), when they experienced difficulty closing the door. Subsequent investigative tests proved the door yielded to approximately 15 psi (100 kPa; 1.0 atm) of pressure, in contrast to the 300 psi (20 atm) that it had been designed to withstand.

== Cause ==
The crash occurred when an incorrectly secured cargo door at the rear of the plane burst open and broke off, causing an explosive decompression that severed critical cables necessary to control the aircraft. To maximise the working space within the cargo hold, the cargo doors opened outwards, making them vulnerable to being forced open at high altitudes under normal in-flight pressure. To prevent this, a special latching system was used that locked shut under pressure when properly closed. To ensure the latches were properly positioned, a handle on the outside of the door pressed small metal pins into the latches; if the latches were in an improper location, the pins would not align and the handle would not close.

The handle on DC-10 cargo doors could close despite the latches being in the wrong position, a discovery made after previous services, most notably during the incident involving American Airlines Flight 96 in 1972. This was because the linkage between the handle and the pins was too weak and allowed the handle to be forced into the closed position. A minor change had been ordered to install a support plate for the handle linkage to make it stronger; manufacturer documents showed this work as completed on the aircraft involved in Flight 981, but the plate had not in fact been installed. It was also noted that the locking pins on the crash aircraft had been filed down at an earlier date to make it easier to close the door. Finally, the latching had been performed by a baggage handler who did not speak Turkish or English, the only languages provided on a warning notice about the cargo door's design flaws and the methods of compensating for them. After the disaster, the latches were redesigned and the locking system was significantly upgraded.

In the following investigation, it was found that a similar set of conditions, which had caused the failure of an aircraft floor following explosive decompression of the cargo hold, had occurred in ground testing in 1970 before the DC-10 series entered commercial service. This was highlighted in a memo from the fuselage's manufacturer, Convair (a division of General Dynamics), to McDonnell Douglas, in which the series of events that occurred on Flight 96, and fatally on Flight 981, was foreseen; it concluded that if these events occurred it would probably result in the loss of the aircraft. In spite of this warning, nothing was done to correct the flaw. The crash resulted in some of the largest civil lawsuits to that date.

== Aftermath ==
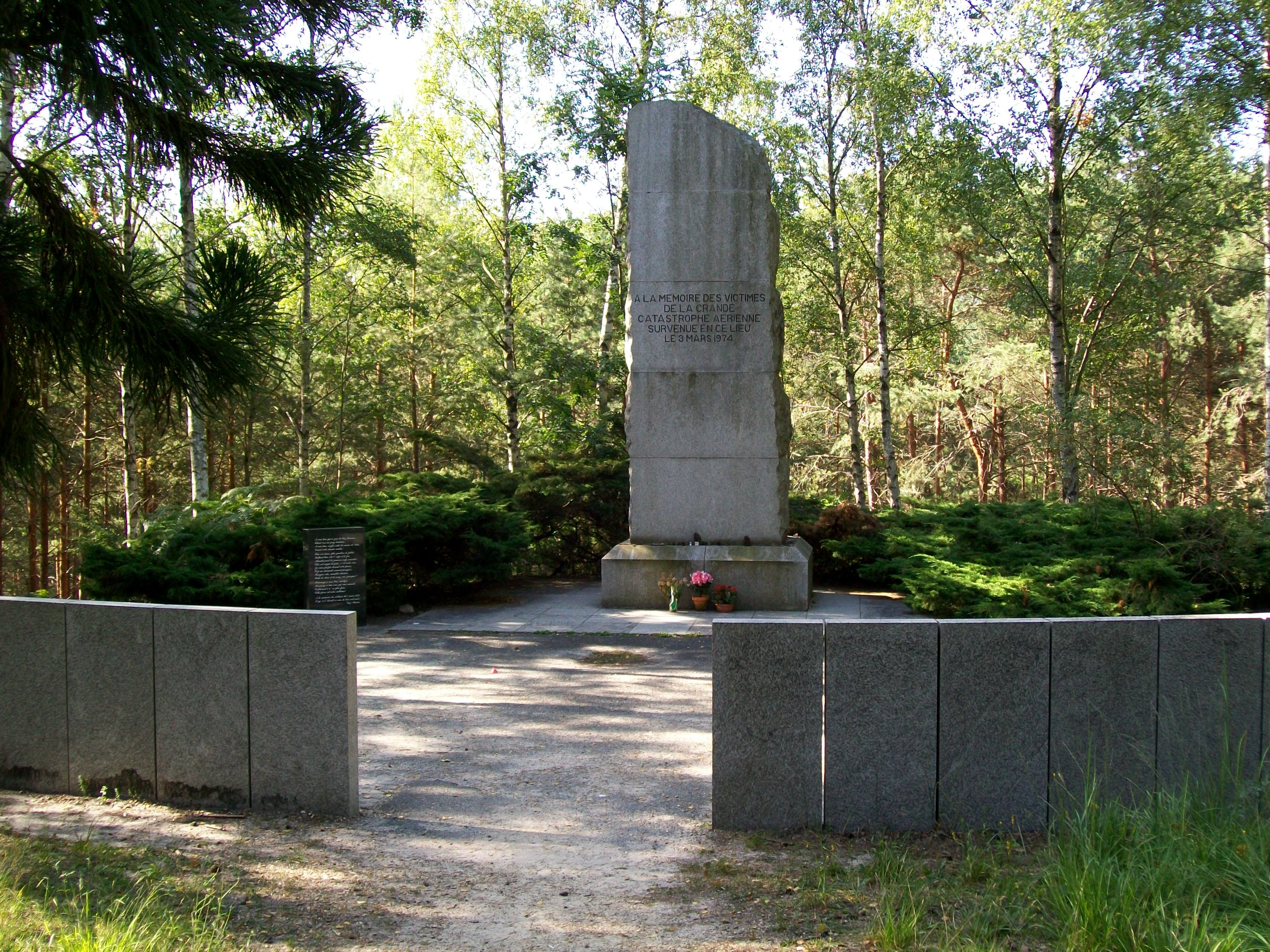
Monument to the crash victims in Ermenonville Forest

Issues related to the latch of the DC-10 include human factors, interface design and engineering responsibility. The control cables for the rear control surfaces of the DC-10 were routed under the floor; therefore, a failure of the hatch resulting in a collapse of the floor could impair the controls. If the hatch were to fail for any reason, there was a high probability the plane would be lost. In addition, Douglas had chosen a new type of latch to seal the cargo hatch. This possibility of catastrophic failure as a result of this overall design was first discovered in 1969 and actually occurred in 1970 in a ground test, both of which McDonnell-Douglas knew about. This information, and the 1972 "Applegate Memo", came to light in the material supplied to the litigants after the 1974 crash.

McDonnell-Douglas subsequently faced multiple lawsuits for the crash of Flight 981 by the families of the victims and others. In its defense during pretrial proceedings, McDonnell-Douglas attempted to blame the FAA for not issuing an airworthiness directive, Turkish Airlines for modification of the cargo door locking pins, and General Dynamics for an incorrect cargo door design. When it became clear that its defenses were unlikely to prevent a finding of liability, McDonnell-Douglas and Turkish Airlines and other associated parties settled out-of-court for an estimated US$100 million (equivalent to $598 million in 2025), including $80 million from McDonnell-Douglas, of which $18 million was paid by its insurer, Lloyd's of London.

After the crash of Flight 981, the latching system was completely redesigned to prevent them from moving into the wrong position.

Turkish Airlines continued using the "Flight 981" designator but for a different flight, Ercan to Antalya, as of February 2023.

== Dramatisation ==
The crash of Turkish Airlines Flight 981 was covered in 2008 in "Behind Closed Doors", a Season Five episode of the internationally syndicated Canadian TV documentary series Mayday, which also covers the similar 1972 incident on American Airlines Flight 96.

Footage of the aftermath appears in the disaster documentary Days of Fury (1979), directed by Fred Warshofsky.

== See also ==
- Michael Hannah, The Lost Years, tribute album for one of the victims
- List of notable decompression accidents and incidents
- List of airliner crashes involving loss of control
- List of accidents involving sports teams
- American Airlines Flight 96, one operation of that flight also using a DC-10 suffered from a cargo hatch failure through the same flawed design.
- United Airlines Flight 811, a flight that experienced a cargo hatch failure
