= 2007 Democratic Party (Italy) leadership election =

2007 election of the leader of the Democratic Party of Italy

2007 Democratic Party leadership election
- 14 October 2007
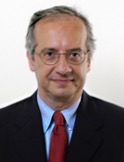

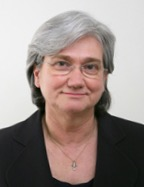

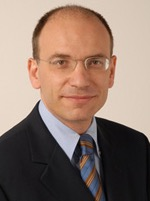
Nominee	Walter Veltroni	Rosy Bindi	Enrico Letta
Delegate count	2322	312	220
Popular vote	2,694,721	459,398	391,775
Percentage	75.8%	12.9%	11.0%
Secretary before election
None
Elected Secretary
Walter Veltroni

The 2007 Democratic Party leadership election was held on 14 October 2007 in order to elect the first leader of the Democratic Party, the largest political party in Italy at the time. The election was conducted as an open primary, with all Italian citizens aged at least 16 and non-Italian legal residents being eligible to vote. A minimum fee of one euro (initially chosen as five euros, lowered to one euro following direct requests by almost all leadership candidates) was requested to voters in order to take part in the election.

The election, attended by over three and a half million voters, ended in a landslide victory for Walter Veltroni, Mayor of Rome and former leader of the Democrats of the Left, who gained 75.8% of the vote, being thus elected as first Democratic Party leader.

== Events ==
Following the national conventions of the Democrats of the Left (DS) and Democracy is Freedom – The Daisy (DL), Romano Prodi announced a list of 45 politicians which would have composed the Organising Committee of the Democratic Party. All members successively met on 18 June 2007 in order to decide the rules regarding the election of the first leader and the 2,400 members of the Constituting Assembly. A method was chosen in order to associate lists with leadership candidates. In order to run into the election, a number of 100 signatures were needed, whereas at least 2,000 approved signatures were requested to run into the leadership race.

=== Leadership race ===
30 July 2007 was the deadline for presenting leadership candidacies. All candidates were requested to be clearly associated with the Democratic Party project, as either members of the political subjects forming it or with no party association at all.

On the 30 July deadline, a total of eleven candidates officially registered their candidacy: Walter Veltroni, Rosy Bindi, Enrico Letta, Furio Colombo, Marco Pannella, Antonio Di Pietro, Mario Adinolfi, Pier Giorgio Gawronski, Jacopo G. Schettini, Lucio Cangini and Amerigo Rutigliano. Of these, Pannella and Di Pietro were stopped because of their involvement in external parties, whereas Cangini and Rutigliano did not manage to present the necessary 2,000 valid signatures for the 9pm deadline, and Colombo's candidacy was instead made into hiatus in order to give him 48 additional hours to integrate the required documentation; Colombo later decided to retire his candidacy citing his impossibility to fit with all the requirements. All rejected candidates had the chance against the decision in 48 hours' time, with Pannella and Rutigliano being the only two candidates to appeal against it. Both were rejected on 3 August.

All polls predicted a clear victory for Veltroni in the election, with results ranging from 65% to 75% circa.

On 26 September 2007, Jacopo G. Schettini retired and announced he was moving his support to Gawronski, running alongside him for the party leadership.

==== Accepted candidacies ====
Walter Veltroni

Walter Veltroni was the incumbent Mayor of Rome and a former Democrats of the Left party leader. His candidacy was publicly requested on 20 June by incumbent Democrats of the Left leader Piero Fassino, who publicly asked Walter Veltroni, being suggested by several opinion polls suggesting Veltroni could potentially win hands down the leadership race.

Veltroni officially announced his intention to run at a widely publicized rally in Turin on 27 June. He ran in a joint ticket with deputy-leadership candidate Dario Franceschini, Olive Tree speaker at the Chamber of Deputies.

Rosy Bindi

Rosaria "Rosy" Bindi was part of the Prodi II Cabinet as Minister of Family (a minister without portfolio) for Democracy is Freedom – The Daisy. She announced her candidacy on 16 July.

Enrico Letta

Enrico Letta was the incumbent undersecretary in the Prodi II Cabinet, and a leading member of Democracy is Freedom – The Daisy. 40-year-old Letta announced his candidacy via a video posted online on his personal website on 24 July.

Minor candidates

- Jacopo G. Schettini, economist on CSR, director of the European Standard Ethics Aei, announced his candidacy just few days after Mr. Veltroni on 3 July.
- Mario Adinolfi, 35-year-old journalist and blogger, and supporter of direct democracy and higher involvement of young people in the national political scenario. He announced his intention to run on 18 July through his blog.
- Pier Giorgio Gawronski, 50-year-old economist and Oxford graduate;

==== Rejected and withdrawn candidacies ====
Marco Pannella

Marco Pannella was a historical leader of the Italian Radicals. He announced his intention to run for the party leadership on 21 July, but this was refused by the Presidency Office. Despite this, Pannella kept on campaigning for his candidacy and received support from Minister of International Commerce and fellow Radical Emma Bonino, who offered herself to campaign as potential deputy leader.

Antonio Di Pietro

On the night of 30 July, a few minutes shy of the deadline, incumbent Minister of Infrastructures and Italy of Values party leader Antonio Di Pietro was officially unveiled as entering the race. His candidacy was however refused due to his commitments to Italy of Values.

Furio Colombo

Furio Colombo was an elected Senator for Democrats of the Left, and former editor-in-law for left-wing newspaper L'Unità. He announced his candidacy on 15 July with an article published on L'Unità itself. His candidacy was initially made into hiatus by the Organizing Committee due to his failure in presenting the original copy of many of the requested 2,000 signatures. Colombo then announced his withdrawal from the competition, citing his impossibility to leave Rome in the days to come due to his Senate commitments.

Minor candidates

- Lucio Cangini, former Mayor of Sarsina and local Democrats of the Left councilman. He did not however run in the leadership race after having failed to hand over a minimum of 2,000 valid signatures in support of his candidacy.
- Amerigo Rutigliano, leader of minor movement Unità Democratica Sinistra Europea (Democratic Union – European Left). He however handed over the necessary signatures with a 30 minutes delay with respect to the 9pm deadline, and his candidacy was therefore rejected.

== Opinion polling ==
Polling Firm	Date	Candidates						Link
Polling Firm	Date	Veltroni	Bindi	Letta	Adinolfi	Schettini	Gawronski	Link
IPSOS	October 12, 2007	70.0–73.0	17.0–19.0	7.0–9.0	0.7–1.4	–	0.3–0.6	
EKMA Srl	October 10	74.0	14.0	8.0	1.0	0.4	0.4	
IPSOS	October 9	73.0–76.0	12.0–15.0	8.0–11.0	0.4–1.2	0.1–0.4	0.5–1.4	
Gipieffe SpA	October 5	78.2	10.4	9.5	0.4	1.1	0.4	
EKMA Srl	October 2	73.0	15.0	7.0	1.5	0.2	0.5	
IPSOS	September 28	75.0–78.0	11.0–14.0	7.0–10.0	0.9–1.7	0.2–0.5	0.9–1.8	
EKMA Srl	September 26	73.0	16.0	6.0	1.5	0.2	0.1	
ISPO	September 24	69.0	12.0	5.0	–	–	–	
EKMA Srl	September 19	70.0	18.0	7.5	2.5	0.3	0.3	
EKMA Srl	September 11	70.0	17.0	7.0	3.0	0.5	0.5	
EKMA Srl	September 5	68.0	15.0	9.0	3.0	–	–	
SWG	August 26	75.0	8.0	7.0	0.5	0.5	0.5	

== Results ==
Official results

Candidate	Total			Lists			
Candidate	Votes	%	Seats	Name	Votes	%	Seats
Walter Veltroni	2,694,721	75.82	2322	Democratici con Veltroni	1,553,946	43.72	1493
Walter Veltroni	2,694,721	75.82	2322	Con Veltroni. Ambiente, innovazione, lavoro	286,811	8.07	172
Walter Veltroni	2,694,721	75.82	2322	A Sinistra con Veltroni	272,111	7.66	226
Walter Veltroni	2,694,721	75.82	2322	Other lists	581,853	16.37	430
Rosy Bindi	459,398	12.93	312	Con Rosy Bindi. Democratici, davvero	459,398	12.93	312
Enrico Letta	391,775	11.02	220	I democratici per Enrico Letta	391,775	11.02	220
Mario Adinolfi	5,924	0.17	0	Generazione U	5,924	0.17	0
Pier Giorgio Gawronski	2,351	0.07	0	Gawronski. Il coraggio di cambiare and Noi per il Partito Democratico	2,351	0.08	0
Total	3,554,169	100.0	2853	Total	3,554,169	100.0	2853

Popular vote
Veltroni	75.82%
Bindi	12.93%
Letta	11.02%
Others	0.24%

=== Delegates summary ===
Portrait	Name	Delegates
	Walter Veltroni	2322/2853 (81%)
	Rosy Bindi	312/2853 (11%)
	Enrico Letta	220/2853 (8%)

== See also ==
- Democratic Party (Italy)
- Primary elections in Italy
