= Gérardin =

- André Gérardin (1879–1953), French mathematician
- Auguste Gérardin (1849-1930), French painter
- Charles Gérardin (1843–1921), French politician
- Edmond Gérardin, French football referee
- Édouard Hippolyte Alexandre Gerardin (1889–1936), French diplomat
- Eugène Gérardin (1827–?), French politician
- Louis Gérardin (1912–1982), French track cyclist
- Louis Gérardin (1862–1907), French industrialist
- Roland-Marie Gérardin (1907-1935), French painter
- Sandra Dijon (born 1976), French basketball player
- Sébastien Gérardin (1751–1816), French naturalist

== See also ==
- Girardin (disambiguation)
- Gérard
- Gerard
- Gherardini
