= Gherardini family =

Noble family from Tuscany, Italy

Gherardini of Montagliari (Florence)
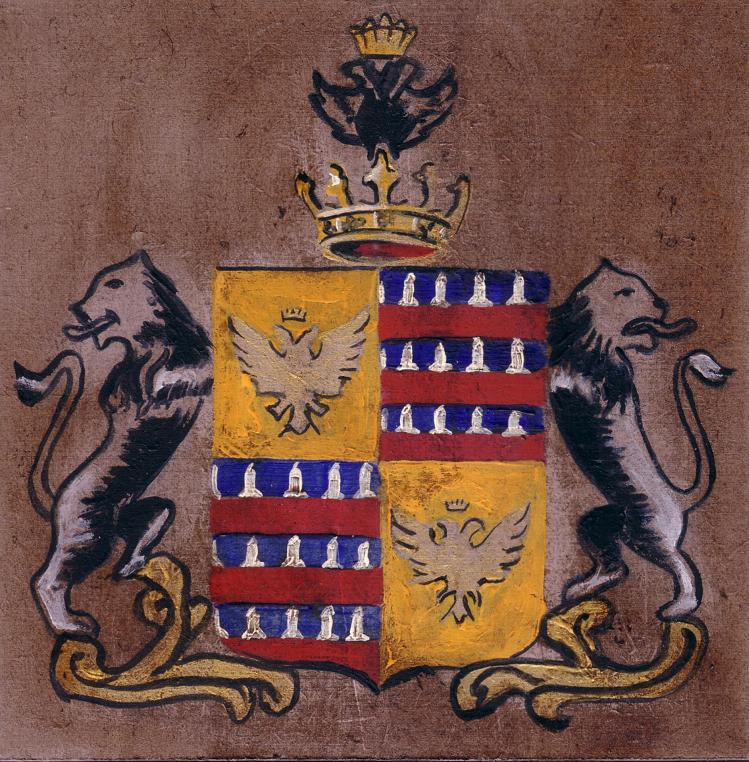
- The coat of arms of the Gherardini of Montagliari in Tuscany, Patrician of Venice, Marquises of San Polo d'Enza, Marquises of Castelnuovo de' Gherardini, Marquises of Bazzano, Scurano and Pianzo, Patricians of Reggio in the Emilia region.
- Current region: Lazio, Tuscany
- Origin: Tuscany
- Founded: 856; 1170 years ago
- Connected families: House of Amidei; House of Medici; House of Strozzi; House of Bardi; House of Albizzi; House of Altoviti
- Motto: "Festina Lente"
- Cadet branches: Gherardini of Tuscany; Gherardini of Veneto; Gherardini of Paris; Gherardini of Ireland; Gard; Fitzgerald

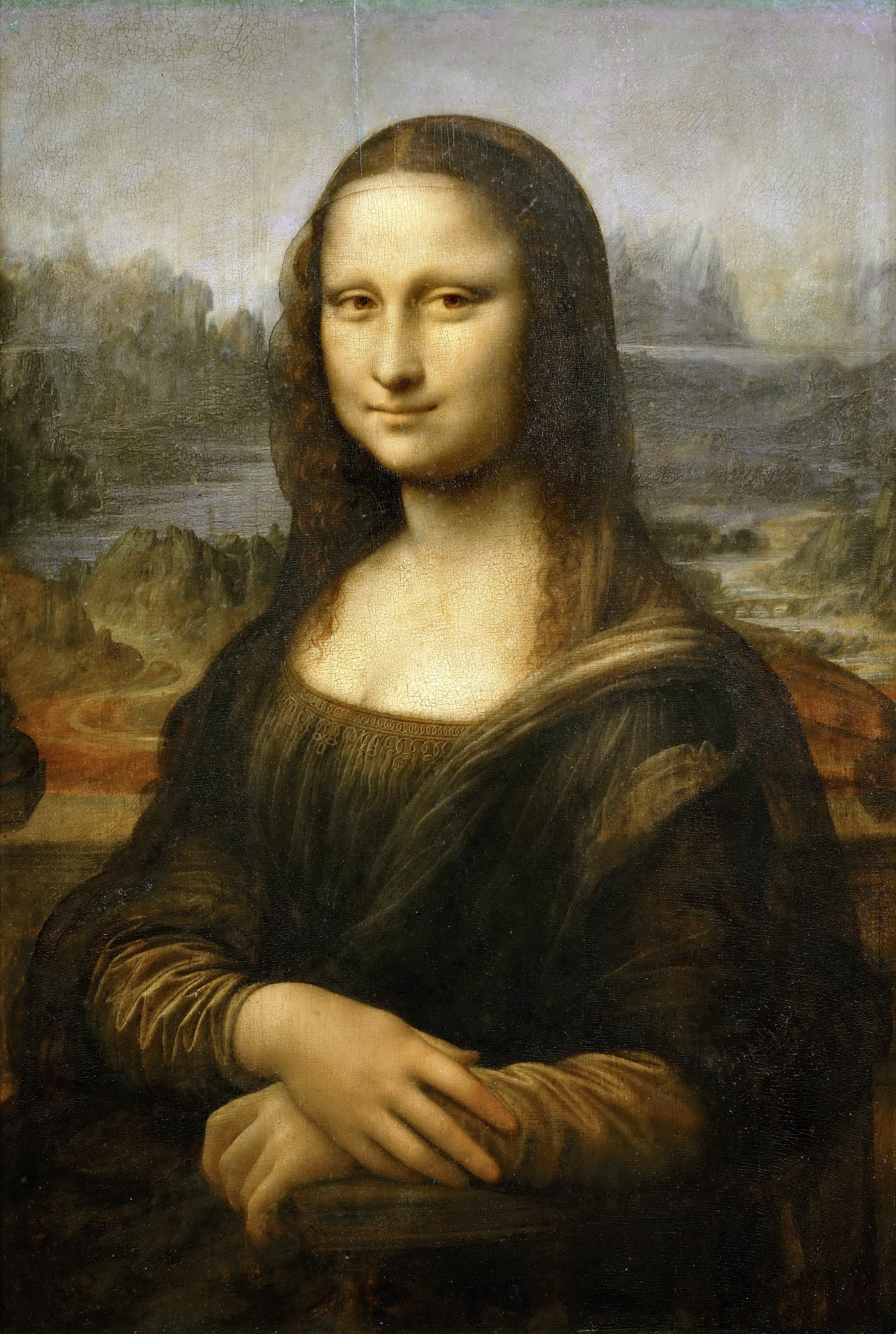
The famous Mona Lisa is the portrait of Lisa Gherardini known as "La Gioconda" because she was married to Francesco Bartolomeo del Giocondo

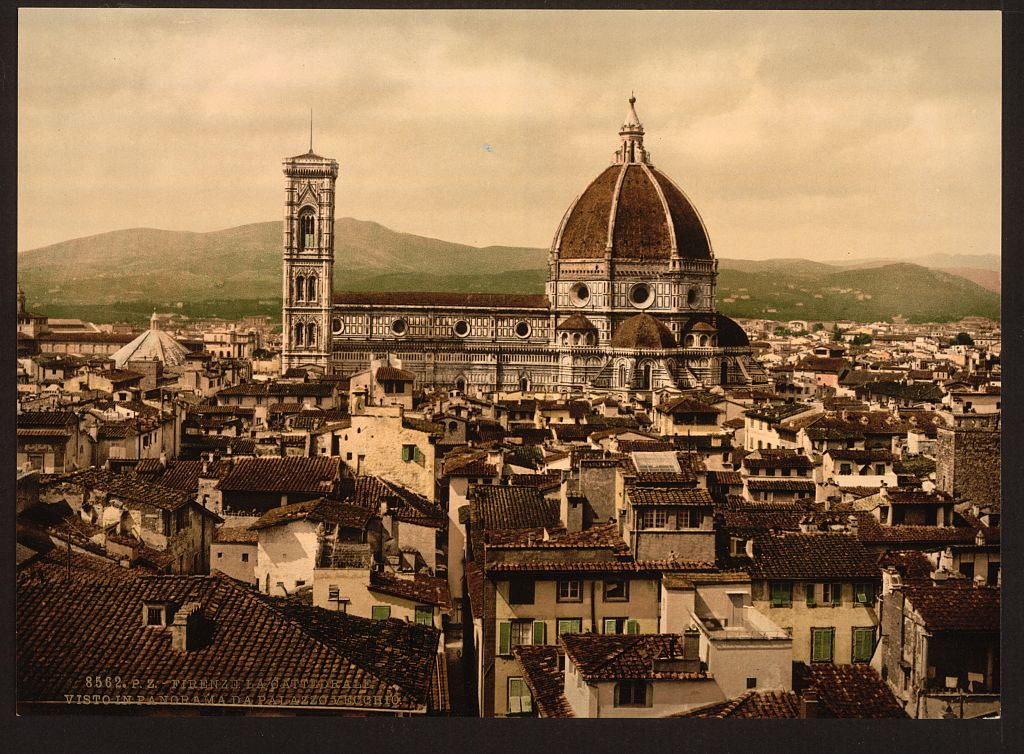
Florence, birthplace of the House of Gherardini, founding family of the Republic before its exile to Venice

The Gherardini family of Montagliari (or Florence) was one of the most prominent historical Italian noble families from Tuscany, Italy. Through the Amideis, the family was of Roman descent. Between the 9th and 14th centuries, they played an important role in Tuscany. Its influence was also felt in the Veneto and Emilia regions between the 16th and 18th centuries, and during the Italian Risorgimento as well as in today's Italian politics and economy. The family's restless and fighting nature has aroused the curiosity of many historians of the Middle Ages. Originating from feudal tradition, it was one of the founding families of the Republic of Florence.

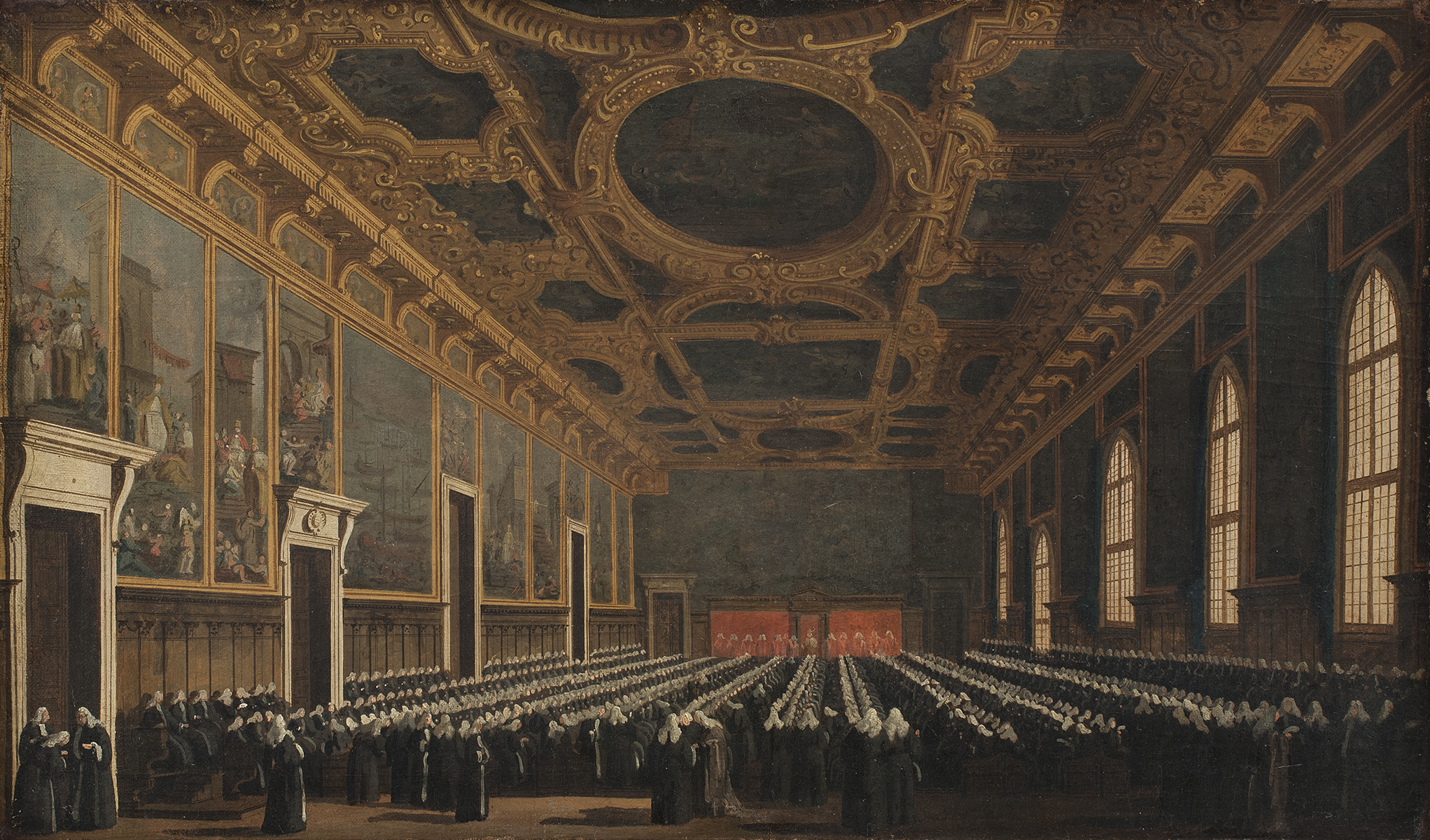
The Great Council of Venice, the Gherardinis of Florence became members of the Venetian patriciate in 1652

The family took part in Florence's political life between 1100 and 1300. In 1300, they were exiled from the city when Florence began its transformation into a Signoria, later ruled by the Medici family. In his Divine Comedy, Dante Alighieri, who was exiled with the Gherardinis, placed the family in Paradise's V Sphere. Following its exile from Tuscany, the family joined the Great Council of Venice (Venice's Chamber of Peers), becoming Patricians of that city, and members of the Venetian nobility. Until 1800, they kept some fiefs between Tuscany and Emilia Romagna.

The oldest knightly tomb in Tuscany (in the Church of Sant'Appiano, near Barberino Val d'Elsa) belongs to this family. Historically influential in Florence, the Gherardinis were also featured in Florentine Histories, a book written by Niccolò Machiavelli at the request of his Medici patron. In modern times, their name is affiliated with the Mona Lisa of Leonardo da Vinci, as the painting depicts the portrait of Lisa Gherardini. Arms of this family is a quarterly Barry of six vair and gules and imperial eagles.

The Gherardinis also married into other Renaissance families across the centuries such as the Medicis, Strozzis, Bardis, Albizzis, Altovitis, Frescobaldis, Albertis, Balestrieris, and Ricasolis.

== Origins ==
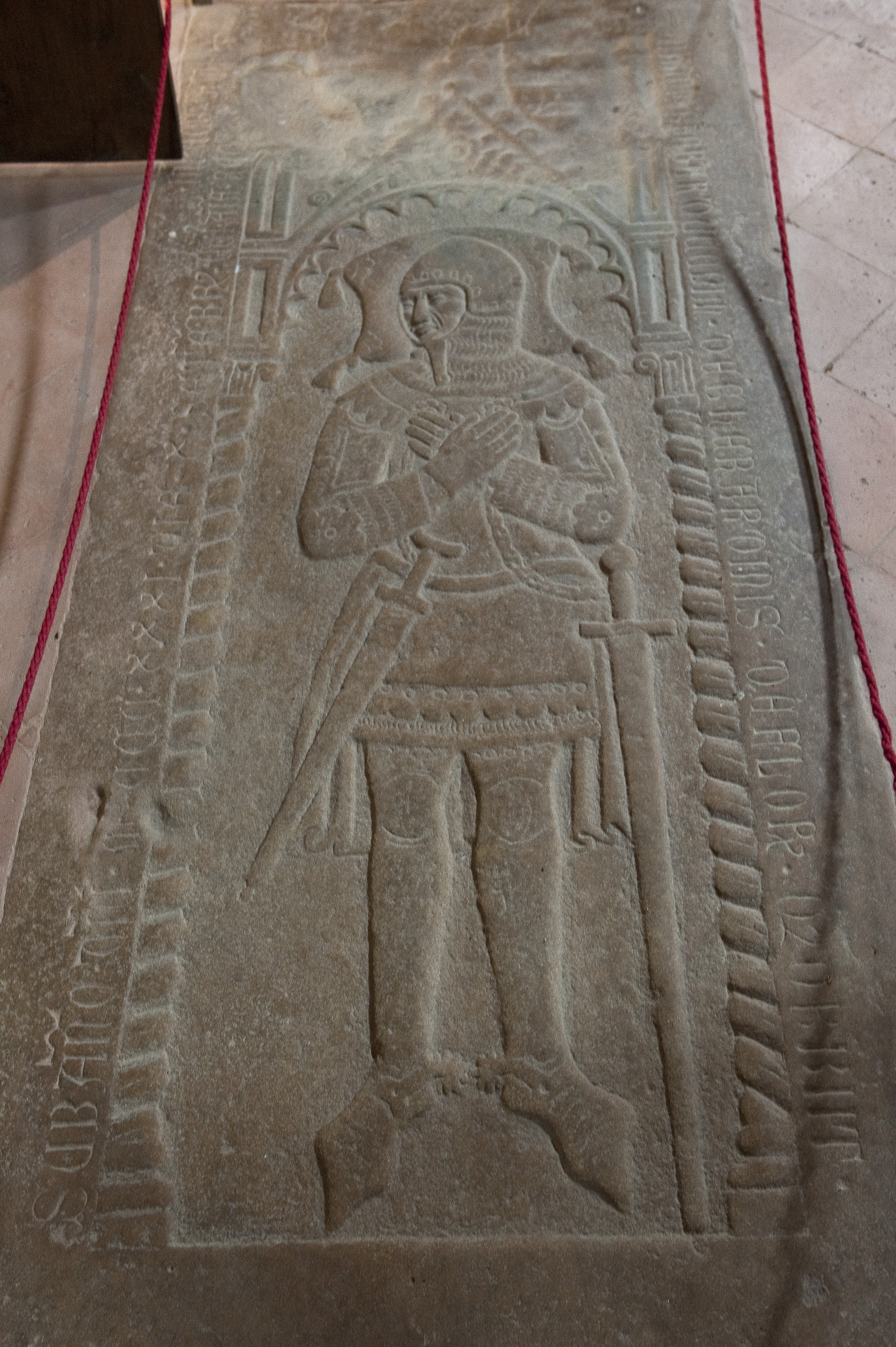
The tomb of knight Gherarduccio Gherardini, oldest knightly tomb in Tuscany, Church of Sant'Appiano, Barberino Val d'Elsa, Florence

According to the most recent university research, in 856 the family founded the Church of San Piero a Ema (with Gaifredo) and "nepotes Ceci" as a sobriquet. The family is described in documents dating back to that period and kept in the San Miniato al Monte church in Florence. They were feudatories in the Chianti and the Val d'Elsa areas and settled in Florence in 1100 following the death of Matilda of Tuscany. They founded the Republic of Florence and had a number of Consuls in the Republic ("Consul Civitatis": heads of government).

Two centuries later, they took part in the fights between the Guelphs and the Ghibellines and subsequently between the White and Black Guelphs; they were with the "White" faction and were opposed to the transformations which led to the birth of the Signoria. Some of the leading figures of the family during that period include: Gherarduccio Gherardini (whose tombstone in the Church of Sant'Appiano is the oldest knightly tomb in Tuscany), Noldo Gherardini, Cece Gherardini, Vanne and Bernardino Gherardini, Lotteringo Gherardini, Cione Gherardini known as "il Pelliccia" and Andrea Gherardini "lo Scacciaguelfi" (the Shoo Away the Guelphs). This era of war between the factions supporting the Pope and the ones supporting the Holy Roman Emperor was later immortalized in Florentine Histories, a book written by Niccolò Machiavelli and commissioned by Cardinal Giulio de' Medici, later known as Pope Clement VII, of the House of Medici, in which the Gherardinis are featured on many occasions.

More recent university studies have confirmed both the central role played by this family in Florence's medieval history and its members' reputation as inflexible as shown by the statistics on penalties and sentences which afflicted some families in that period. According to Christiane Klapisch-Zuber, a French historian, the Gherardinis from Montagliari were "instigators of disorders", "with little desire to participate in public life". They were also a "bellicose and rude" family. This deeply independent character must have been at the basis of the family's decision not to abide by the new rules of the rising Commune of Florence such as the Ordinances of Justice of 1296 which aimed at forcing aristocracy to give up their names of origin and privileges. Unless they did so, there were very high taxes and penalties for them. Their opposition explains the passion with which Florence fought them, destroying, where possible, their assets.

== Civil War and exile ==
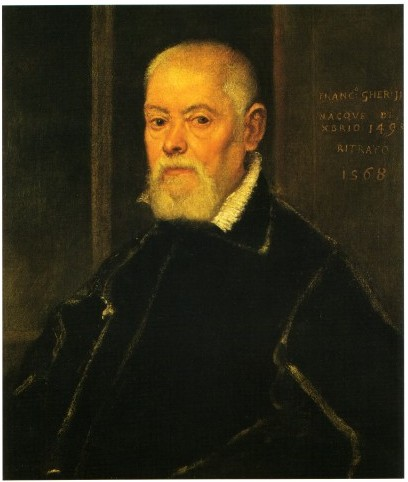
Portrait of Marquis Francesco Gherardini, by Tintoretto, 1568

Following many years of civil war, the Gherardinis were exiled in 1302 because they were accused of having forged an alliance with the neighbouring city of Siena. According to historians (and contemporaries of the time), the accusation was based on false documents and invented by Cante Gabrielli, the Podestà, to stamp out this family and its allies once and for all. Following this accusation, Florence attacked the Gherardinis. The land they owned or controlled went from the first sighting centres near the southern walls of Florence, and from Marignolle up to Impruneta. It then went on up to the main fortresses of Montagliari and Montaguto near the current Greve in Chianti. To the west, their land went all the way up to the fortress of Linari near Barberino Val d'Elsa.

In the summer of 1302, following a siege, both Montagliari and Montaguto were burned to the ground. The Republic of Florence then decreed that it was no longer possible to build on this area. This edict was breached by the Gherardinis in 1632 when they built a chapel. The western part of the Gherardini's land and properties withstood the attack by the Florentines because Andrea Gherardini was ruling the nearby city of Pistoia and the Gherardinis enjoyed greater strength in Valdelsa (a valley south of Florence). A few years later, Henry VII, Holy Roman Emperor tried to remove this family from Valdelsa but did not succeed because the Castle of Linari, led by Vanne Gherardini, withstood the summer siege of 1313. Following the death of Gherarduccio Gherardini in 1331 (buried in the Church of Sant'Appiano, near Linari), the family lost its last great commander and the last remaining properties were gradually lost too.

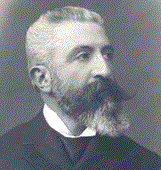
Marquis Gian Francesco Gherardini, Senator of the Kingdom of Italy, 1905

After the fall of Montagliari, and the subsequent loss of their land and properties in Val d'Elsa, the last Gherardinis (except a small group) went into exile to Verona that, at that time, was under the Empire. Dante Alighieri went into exile with them too. At the same time, the Florentines finished to destroy the Gherardinis' buildings in the city as well as other evidence of their life there. This was their third exodus. The previous expulsion of the Ghibellinis, half a century earlier, meant that some Gherardinis moved near Verona and Rovigo (they came together again later on). The first exodus took place around 1120 with the death of Matilda of Tuscany. One of the heads of the family, Gherardino, and his children (Tommaso, Gherardo and Maurizio) decided to leave Tuscany. Initially they were members of the retinue of Louis VII of France, called the Young, and then they were with Henry II of England and went to conquer Ireland, where they started the FitzGerald dynasty. This topic is still being studied by some historians.

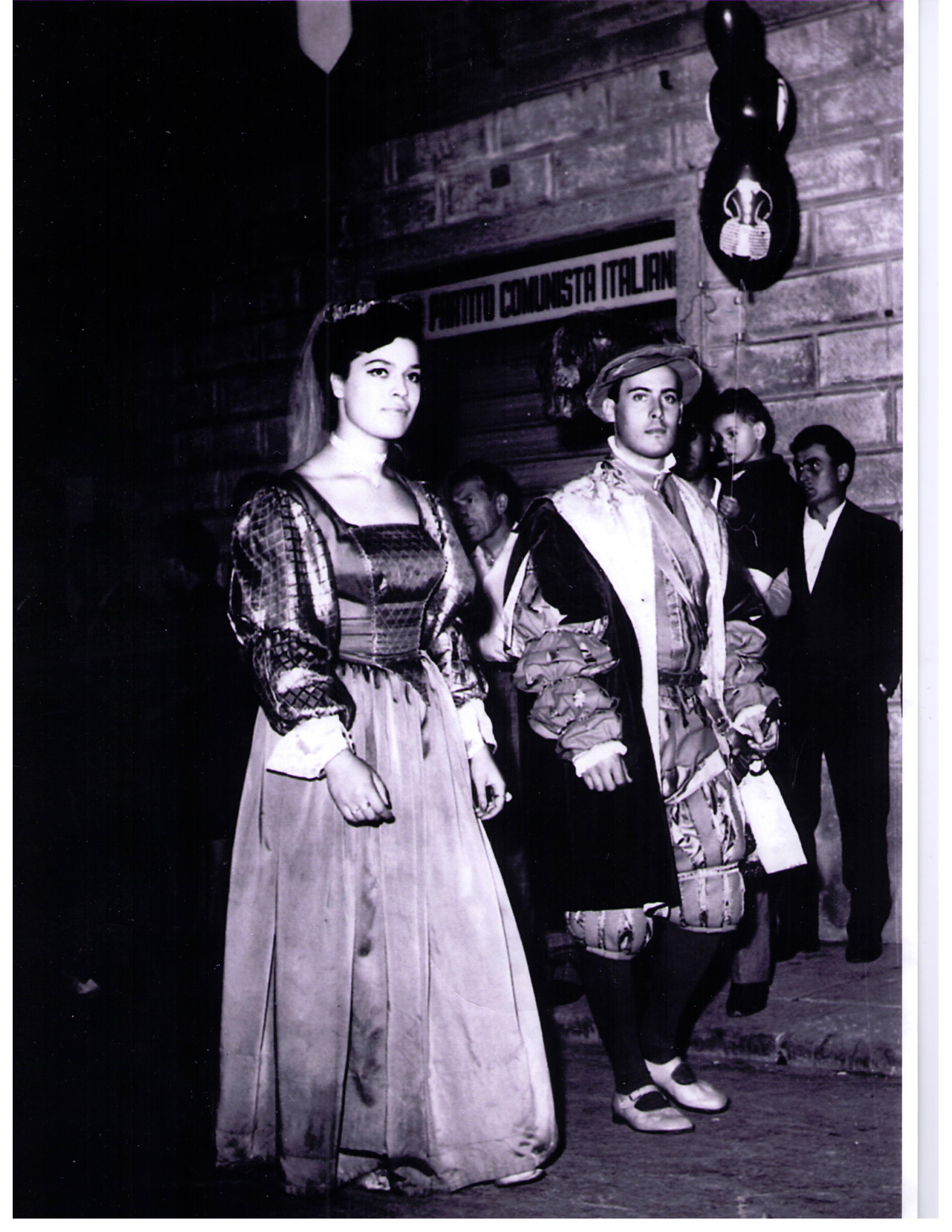
Count Gian Raffaello Gherardini in 1966 during the parade of the Florentines' Calcio Storico (Historical Football). From the archives of the Calcio Storico.

== The current branch ==
In 1633 thanks to Gaspare and Angelo, the main branch, that had settled in Verona between 1300 and 1400, added some properties in the Emilia region to the fiefs they had received when they had arrived (Montorio, Bardolino, Sorgate and Montecchiana). From the House of Este and the House of Gonzaga, they bought the Marquisate of Scurano, Bazzano and Pianzo, that of San Polo d'Enza, and in 1652 the Marquisate of Castelnovo di Sotto. On 19 November 1652, during the War of Candia, Bernardino, younger brother of Gaspare and Angelo, welcomed the Gherardinis among the Venetian noble families of the Great Council of the Republic of Venice, about the same time as did the Medici.

The two branches came together again in 1811. With the arrival of Napoleon Bonaparte, the Republic of Venice and Venice were occupied by the French and given to Austria, which would change the future of the Gherardinis. While their fiefs were occupied and absorbed by the Napoleonic kingdoms in 1805, the Gherardinis, after ten centuries of being Lords in Europe, lost their independence, which led them to reconsider their relations with the House of Habsburg and Austria. This is why they started to support the new cause of Risorgimento – the unity of Italy – and subsequently, following the unity, they took part in Italian political life and often served in the armed forces. A notable member was General Gian Claudio Gherardini.

== Other branches ==
After the exile in 1300, a small branch stayed on in Tuscany but died out in the 18th century with four brothers: Hippolytus (died as a baby); Anthony (died in the war of Hungary); Alemanno (Knight of Malta) and Fabio, who was the last to die in Denmark in 1743. None of them left any heir. This was the branch Lisa Gherardini, the Gioconda, belonged to. In 1632, this branch and the current branch built the Chapel of Santa Maria della Neve in Montagliari (subsequently drawn by Leonardo da Vinci).

In January 1857, with a Decree of the Duke of Modena, another branch took on "Gherardini-Parigi" as its surname in order to continue the line of Gian Marco Gherardini's mother, Alda Parigi of the Counts of San Severino. However, this branch too soon died out with the death of his grandson, Giulio, in the mid-20th century. From 1660 another branch lived in Lendinara and in Ferrara (Noble family of Lendinara, Counts of Lusia, Noble family of Ferrara). This branch originated with Francesco di Corradino but died out in 1830 in Ferrara because Francesco had only one daughter, Isotta, born in 1817.

An older branch developed in France with Girardin as its surname. According to a well-documented historical event referring to Peter and Lotto, sons of Noldo of the Gherardinis, in August 1343, they followed Walter VI of Brienne, Duke of Athens, to France. According to some sources, they were granted the Signoria of Marail in the Champagne region. Peter died on 9 September 1393 and is buried in the Church of Marail (Castle of Hervì). The Marquis René de Girardin (1735–1808), owner of the Château d'Ermenonville and friend of Jean-Jacques Rousseau, claimed to belong to this branch. Other members of the Girardin family included Louis Stanislas de Girardin, Émile de Girardin, and Delphine de Girardin, and the remaining Girardins in Paris.

The Gherardinis of Ireland branch started by Thomas, Gerard and Maurice, sons of Gherardino, still exist today and is headed by the Duke of Leinster. This branch left with Henry II of England to go and conquer Ireland where they initiated the House of FitzGerald, one of the oldest dynasty of Ireland. The FitzGerald Dukes and the Gherardinis of Montagliari are known to be in touch since at least the 15th century and were featured recently in "Sette" magazine of Corriere della Sera. In communication letters dating back to 1507 between the Gherardinis of Tuscany and Gerald FitzGerald, 8th Earl of Kildare, who was also the Viceroy of Ireland and King Henry Tudor's cousin, the Earl's letters were signed as "Gerald, Chief in Ireland of the family of the Gherardini".

== Alliances ==
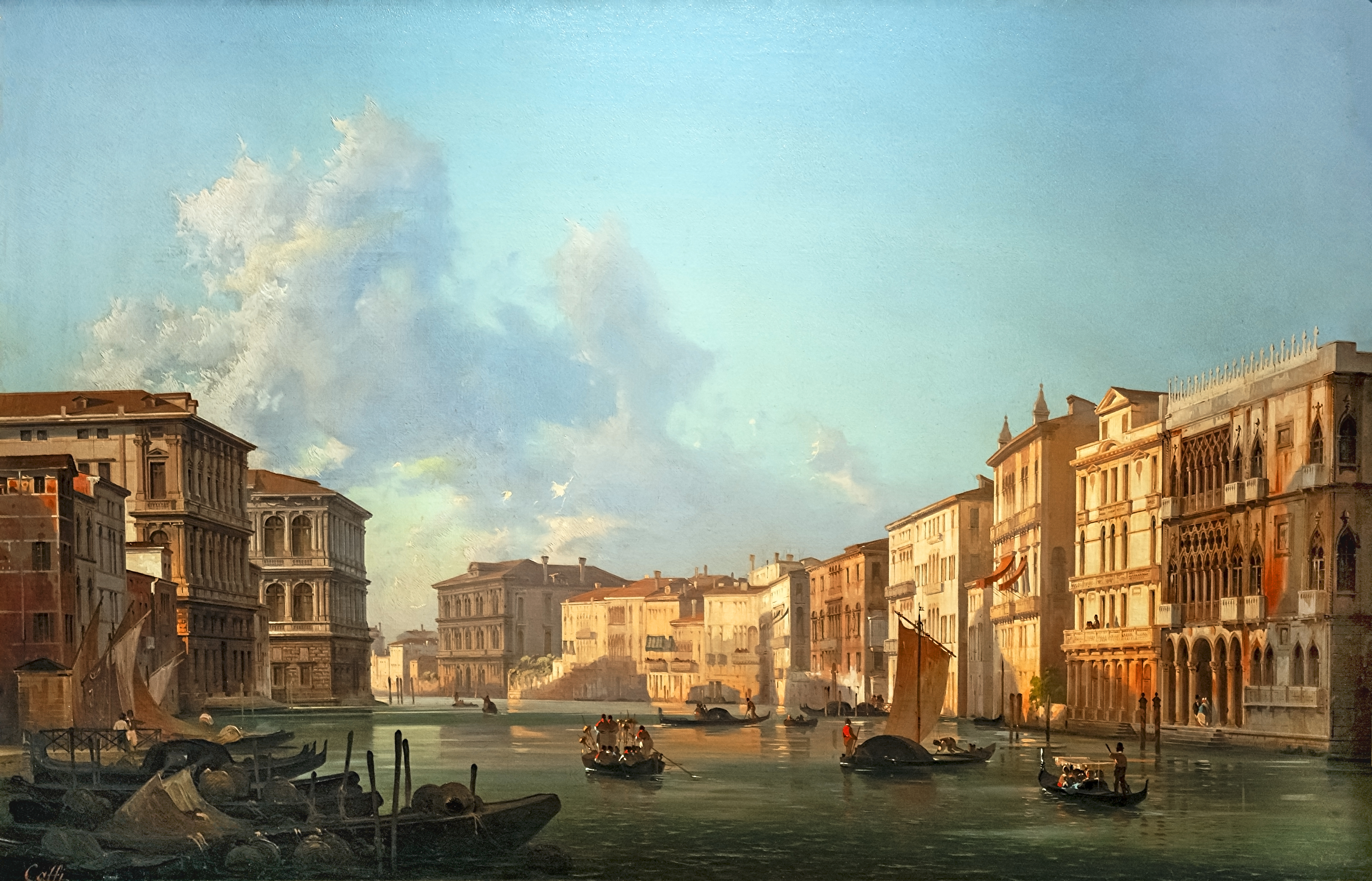
Venice, showing Ca' Rezzonico on the left, where paintings of the Gherardinis are exposed

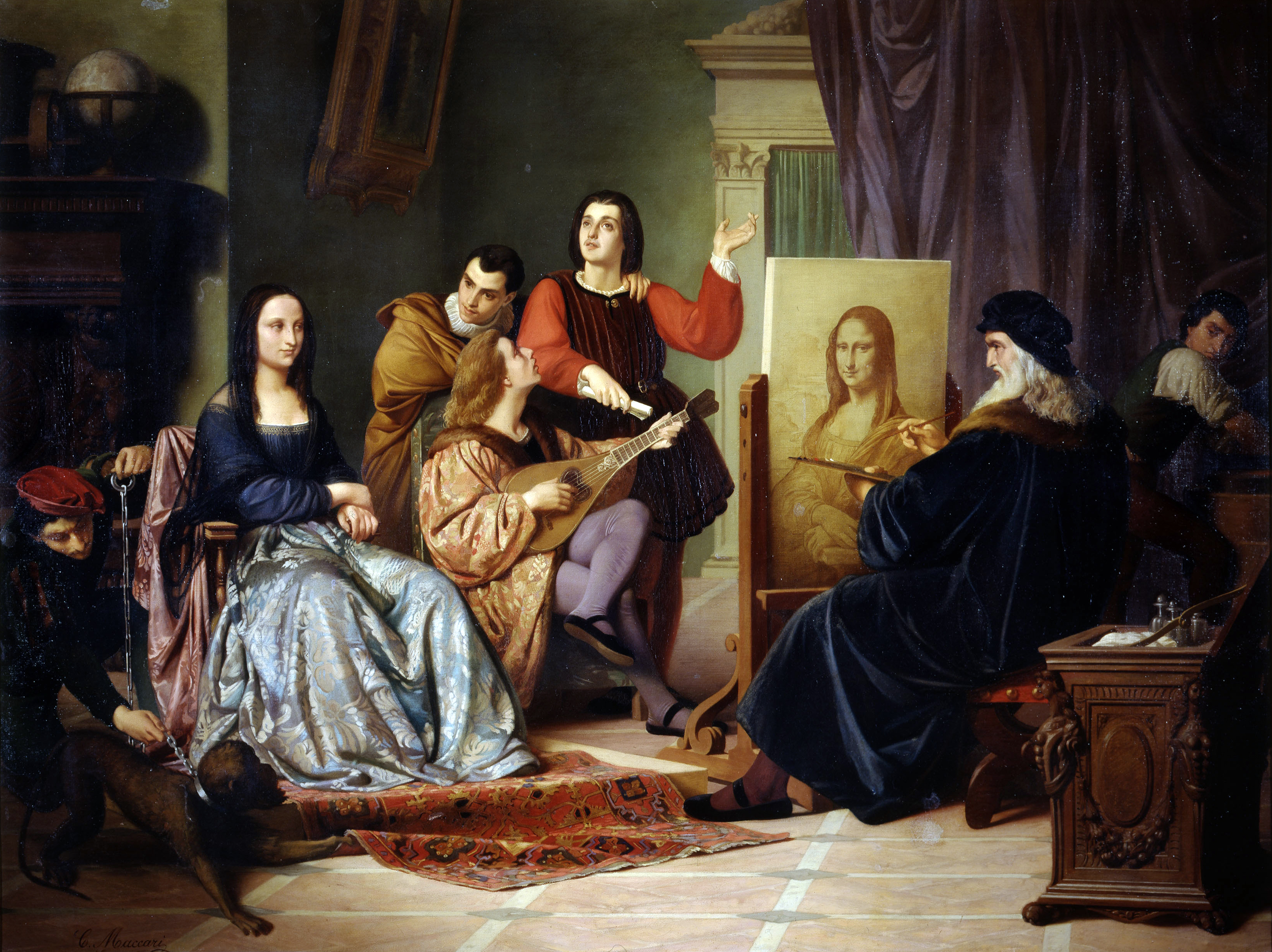
Leonardo da Vinci painting the portrait of La Gioconda, by artist Cesare Maccari

Lisa Gherardini married to Francesco del Giocondo, whose family were silk merchants. He was previously married to a member of the Rucellai family, owners of Palazzo Rucellai. One of Francesco's relative was Giannetto Giocondo, who had business dealings with Amerigo Vespucci, the explorer who gave his name to America.

The Gherardinis married four times with members of the Medici family of Florence. The marriages were as follow; Venna de Medici married to Francesco Gherardini, Leonarda de Medici married to Guelfo Gherardini, Giuliano de Medici married to Tita Gherardini, and Nicolo Rosso de Medici married to Clemenza Gherardini.

Leonarda was a member of the family of Salvestro de' Medici, a second cousin of Averardo de' Medici, father of Giovanni di Bicci de' Medici, the founder of the Medici Bank.

Giuliano was Castellan of the Fortress of Sansepolcro, and son of a Magistrate. His great-grandfathers were Niccolo de Medici, also a descendant of the Averardo branch, and Bice Strozzi, a member of the House of Strozzi. His great-aunt was Aurelia de Medici, who married Luca di Maso degli Albizzi, brother of Rinaldo degli Albizzi, the primary opponent of Cosimo. They were also descendants of Chiarissimo I de' Medici, son of the founder of the Medici family, and father of Filippo, who married to Alessia Grimaldi of Genova, of the Grimaldi family of Monaco.

Marriages of the Gherardinis over the centuries included the Houses of Medici, Strozzi, Bardi, Albizzi, Altoviti, Frescobaldi, Balestrieri, Alberti, Ricasoli, among others. The Gherardinis were also related to the Amidei, according to historian Ricordano Malespini, and thus to its cousin branch, the House of Piccolomini, who were Patricians of Siena and allies of Vlad Dracula and the Venetians during the reign of Pope Pius II.

Many of these families played a major role in the Renaissance, and were patrons of famous figures such as Michelangelo, Raphael, Leonardo da Vinci, Galileo, Vasari, Brunelleschi, Botticelli, Machiavelli, and many others. Also, their relatives, the House of Bardi, who were a noble family of bankers during the Age of Discovery, were early financiers of John Cabot and Christopher Columbus and their expeditions to the Americas.

== Patronage ==
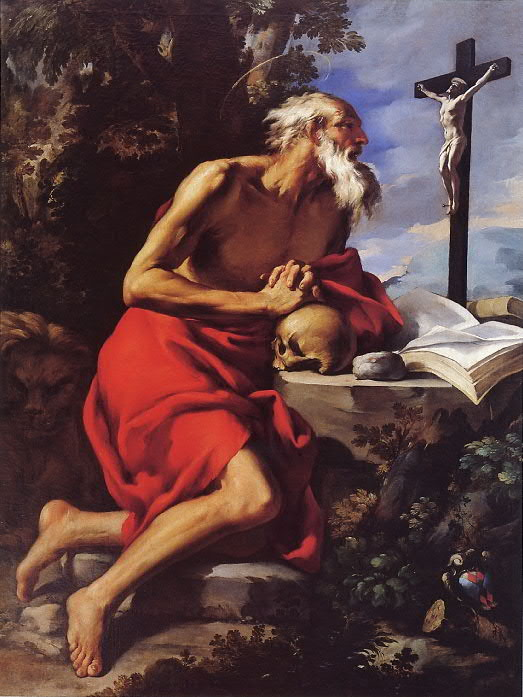
Alessandro Gherardini, pupil of Alessandro Rosi, worked on the Complesso di San Firenze

One of the peculiarities of this family, defined by historians as "rude" and hardly observant of the rules of public life, is a constant vein of patronage. Some serious patronage is well documented like the commission given to Fra Angelico to create an altarpiece for the family chapel near the Church of Santo Stefano al Ponte in Florence. Lotteringo Gherardini is buried in this church. The altarpiece was commissioned in 1418 but went lost. According to art historians, the Gherardinis supported Alessandro Turchi, called l'Orbetto, who they commissioned many works of art to. Nothing is known about the relationship between the family and Tintoretto, except that the Gherardinis were members of the Great Council of the Republic of Venice and, therefore, frequented Venice.

However, in 1568 the Venetian painter drew the portrait of Francesco Gherardini. The portrait is on display at the Ca' Rezzonico Museum of Venice. Although there were contacts with Leonardo da Vinci, their full nature is not known. Leonardo drew both the portrait of Lisa Gherardini (Mona Lisa) and the Gherardinis' Chapel in Montagliari. An artist of the family, Alessandro Gherardini, pupil of Alessandro Rosi, obtained a commission by Prince Ferdinando de Medici for a fresco celebrating his marriage to Princess Violante Beatrice of Bavaria. The fresco can be seen today at the Pitti Palace in Florence.

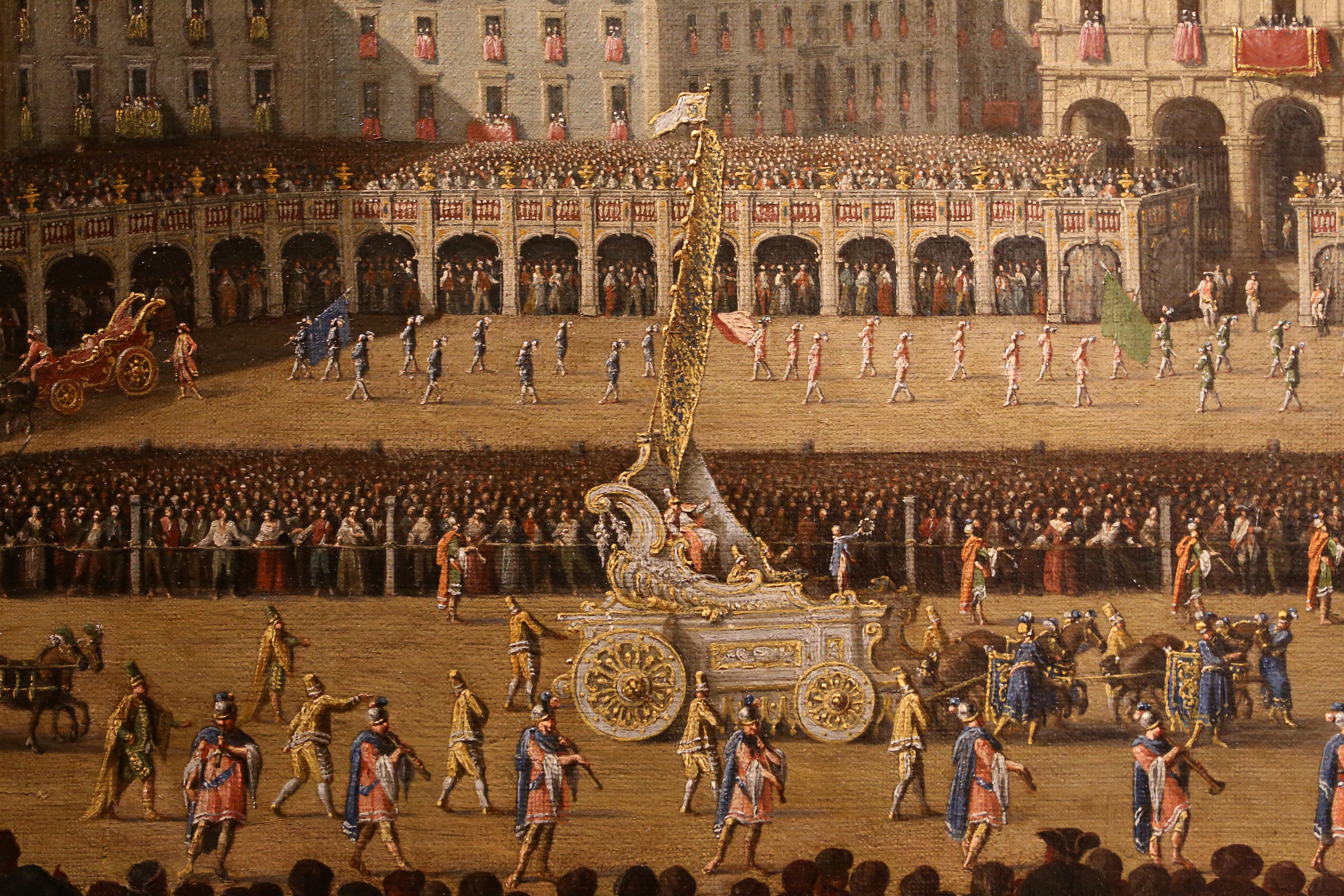
Tommaso Gherardini, worked on the Medici Villa del Poggio Imperiale

Other known artists of the Gherardini family were Tommaso Gherardini, Stefano Gherardini, Melchiorre Gherardini, and Niccolò Gherardini, a friend of Galileo Galilei and his personal biographer. Niccolo wrote the first biography of Galileo named Vita del signor Galileo Galilei (Life of Signor Galileo Galilei), and was a relative of Pope Urban VIII of the House of Barberini.

A painting commissioned by the family in 2010 can be seen in the Church of Sant'Appiano, still used by the family and where Gherarduccio Gherardini is buried. At the bottom of its frame, visitors can read the following:

Florentiae clarissimae Gherardinis familiae nos J.Raphaelus Dominus Cynthiaque MariaTeresia Dominae comites hanc operam in Gherarducci memoriam Sancti Appiani Templo donant. A.D. MMX.

== Recent history ==
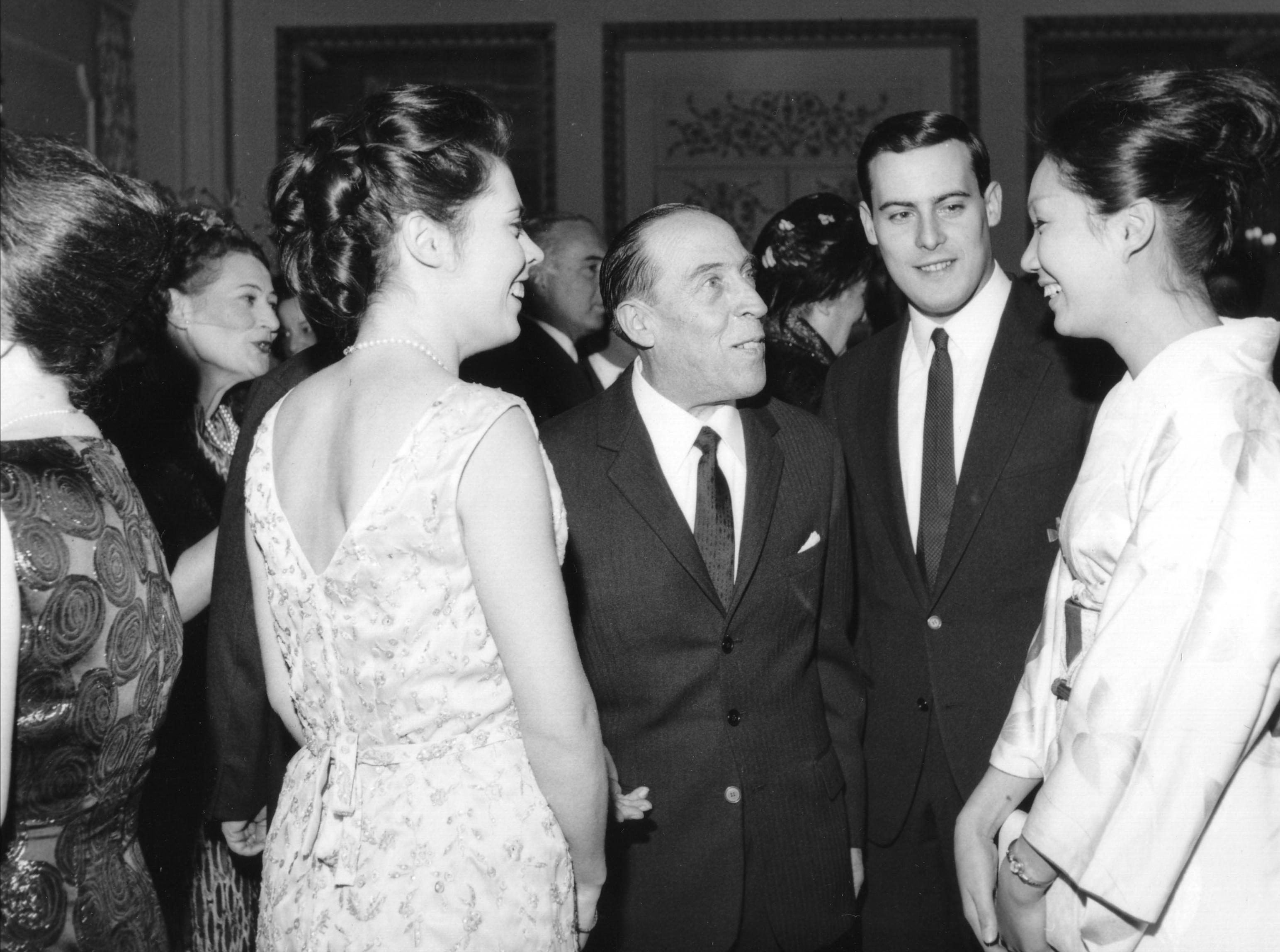
Count Gian Claudio Gherardini at a public event in Florence in 1964. Lo Specchio (weekly magazine), 1964.

According to the last Register of Italian Nobility approved by the Ministry of the Interior of the Kingdom of Italy (1939) and in accordance with its official genealogy, the Gherardinis of Montagliari are divided into two branches: one branch is headed by Marquis Francesco Alberto (primogeniture) whereas the second is headed by Count Gian Claudio (cadet branch). The current residences of the Marquises and Counts Gherardini are in Rome, Venice, Florence, Missouri, California, and New York. Although the family is not interested in being in the news, some articles were written in 2007 and 2010 on Countess Cinzia Maria Gherardini, the current oldest member of the family.

A 2014 cover story published by Sette, the Italian weekly magazine of Corriere della Sera, was dedicated to the Gherardini family and their relationship with the FitzGerald family as well with the Kennedy family. The magazine stated that the three families have maintained relationship among them even in recent time or in the past (for example with American President John Fitzgerald Kennedy).

Some of the most recent and best known members of the Gherardini family are: Marquis Maurizio, Great Chamberlain of the Emperor of Austria and Austria's Minister Plenipotentiary at the Kingdom of Sardinia; Princess Cristina Trivulzio Belgiojoso (daughter of Marchioness Vittoria Gherardini), first female newspaper director whom Carlo Cattaneo defined the "first lady of Italy" for her commitment towards national unity; Marquis Gian Marco, Chairman of the Savings Bank of Reggio Emilia and Podestà of the Municipality of Reggio Emilia from 1851 to 1854.

His son Gian Francesco Gherardini, was mayor of Reggio Emilia from 1873 to 1881, Member of Parliament and subsequently Senator until his death in 1926; his grandson, Count Gian Claudio Gherardini, was Commander of the 8th Bersaglieri (Marksmen) Regiment in El Alamein and subsequently Commanding General of Folgore Parachute Brigade who died in 1971) and was the first one to bring back to Florence the Gherardini of Montagliari after seven centuries; his great-grandson, the economist Jacopo Schettini Gherardini, candidate for the National Secretariat of the Democratic Party (Italy) during the primary elections of 2007.
