= Girardin =

Girardin is a French-language surname, in some cases a francization of Italian surname Gherardini. It may refer to:

People

- Girardin family, a French branch of the Italian Gherardini family:
  - Pierre de Girardin (d. 1689), French ambassador to Constantinople
  - Jean-Louis Girardin de Vauvré (1647–1724), French Navy administrator
  - René de Girardin, Marquis de Vauvray (1735–1808), French gardener and writer on gardens, Jean-Louis's grandon
  - Louis Stanislas de Girardin (1762–1827), French general and politician, René-Louis's son
  - Louis de Girardin (1767–1848), French politician, René-Louis's son
  - Alexandre-Louis-Robert Girardin d'Ermenonville (1776–1855), French general, René-Louis's son
  - Ernest Stanislas de Girardin (1802–1874), French politician, Louis Stanislas's son
  - Émile de Girardin (1806–1881), French journalist, Alexandre's illegitimate son
  - Delphine de Girardin, née Gay, (1804–1855), French writer, Émile's wife
- Annick Girardin (b. 1964), French politician
- Auguste Girardin (1830–1915), French politician
- Brigitte Girardin (born 1953), French politician
- Émile Girardin (1895–1982), Canadian businessman
- Éric Girardin (b. 1962), French politician
- Étienne Girardin (b. 1994), French singer of chorus group Vox Angeli
- Eugène-Alexandre Girardin (1888–1972), French architect
- Frank J. Girardin (1856–1945), American artist
- Jean Girardin (1803–1884), French chemist
- Jules Girardin (1832–1888), French writer
- Lise Girardin (1921–2010), Swiss politician
- Marc Girardin a.k.a. Saint-Marc Girardin (1801–1873), French politician
- Marie-Louise Victoire Girardin (1754–1794), French ship's steward and cross-dresser
- Nicolas-Claude Girardin (1749–1786), French architect
- Paul Girardin (1875–1950), French geographer
- Ray Girardin (1935–2019), American film, stage and television actor

Companies

- Girardin Brewery (est. 1845), a family owned brewery in Belgium
- Girardin Minibus (est. 1935), a Canadian bus manufacturer

== See also ==
- Girard (disambiguation) and Girard (surname)
- Gérardin
- Gherardini and Gherardini family
- Girardin (disambiguation) ·Girardin (surname) ·All pages · Living people · WP search · links
