= Gherardini =

Gherardini is an Italian surname. Notable people with the surname include:

- Gherardini family of Montagliari, aristocratic family of Florence
- Alessandro Gherardini (1655–1723), Italian painter of Baroque Florence
- Jacopo Schettini Gherardini (born 1965), Italian economist
- Maurizio Gherardini (born 1955), Italian sportsman, general manager for the Fenerbahçe Basketball
- Lisa Gherardini (1479–1542), woman depicted in the Mona Lisa painting
- Melchiorre Gherardini (1607–1668), Italian painter, known as Ceranino
- Stefano Gherardini (1695–1755), Italian genre painter
- Tommaso Gherardini (1715–1797), Italian painter of late 18th-century Florence

== See also ==
- Gherardi
- Gherardesca
- Girardin, surname taken by members of the Gherardini family in France
