= Balestrieri =

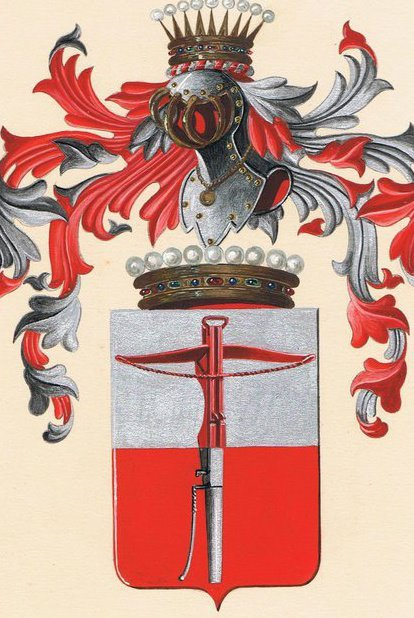
Armorial Bearings of the House of Balestrieri, created Counts by the Duke of Parma and Piacenza in 1795

The House of Balestrièri is an Italian noble family, originating from Venice in the Early Middle Ages, with major branches extending over time to Ancona, Parma, Brescia, Florence, Siena, Naples, and Sicily. The House entered into alliances and/or marriages with the Strozzi, Gherardini, Piccolomini, and Alberti Families.

== History ==
The Italian word, balestrièri, is etymologically derived from the Latin noun balistrarii, the genitive of the Latin balistrarius signifying "of the crossbowman".

With their origins in Venice, specifically Malamocco, the most ancient Balestrièri are recorded as having served as tribunes (Tribuni maiori) in the 8th century. Last recorded at the Serrata del Maggior Consiglio held in 1297, the Venetian branch is said to have become extinct in 1301 with the death of Ser Rinaldo.

The branch of the Balestrièri of Florence (de' Balestrieri), according to Roberto Ciabani, the Italian historian and author of Le Famiglie di Firenze (Firenze: Bonechi, 1992), achieved fame through military service, earning the Capo d'Angio, the heraldic Chief of Anjou, in recognition for long-standing service to the Guelph cause and papacy. It subsequently obtained a monopoly over the Florentine production and sale of crossbows.

In the 12th century, the crossbow became so feared by armored knights that the Second Ecumenical Council of the Lateran (AD 1139) restricted its use in warfare, with Pope Gregory IX promulgating this restriction in his Decretals (c. un., X, V, 15):

"Canon 29. We, moreover, for the rest, prohibit under anathema that the art of the crossbowmen and archers, deadly and hateful to God, be exercised against Christians and Catholics." (Latin: Artem autem illam mortiferam et Deo odibilem ballistariorum et sagittariorum adversus christianos et catholicos exerceri de cetero sub anathemate prohibemus.) Since the anathema (automatic or latae sententiae excommunication) of the Second Lateran Council applied only to the crossbow being used against Christians and Catholics, the crossbow became the weapon of choice against Muslims in the Holy Land, other pagans in Europe, heretics, and Ottomans in defense of Christendom's Mediterranean coastline.

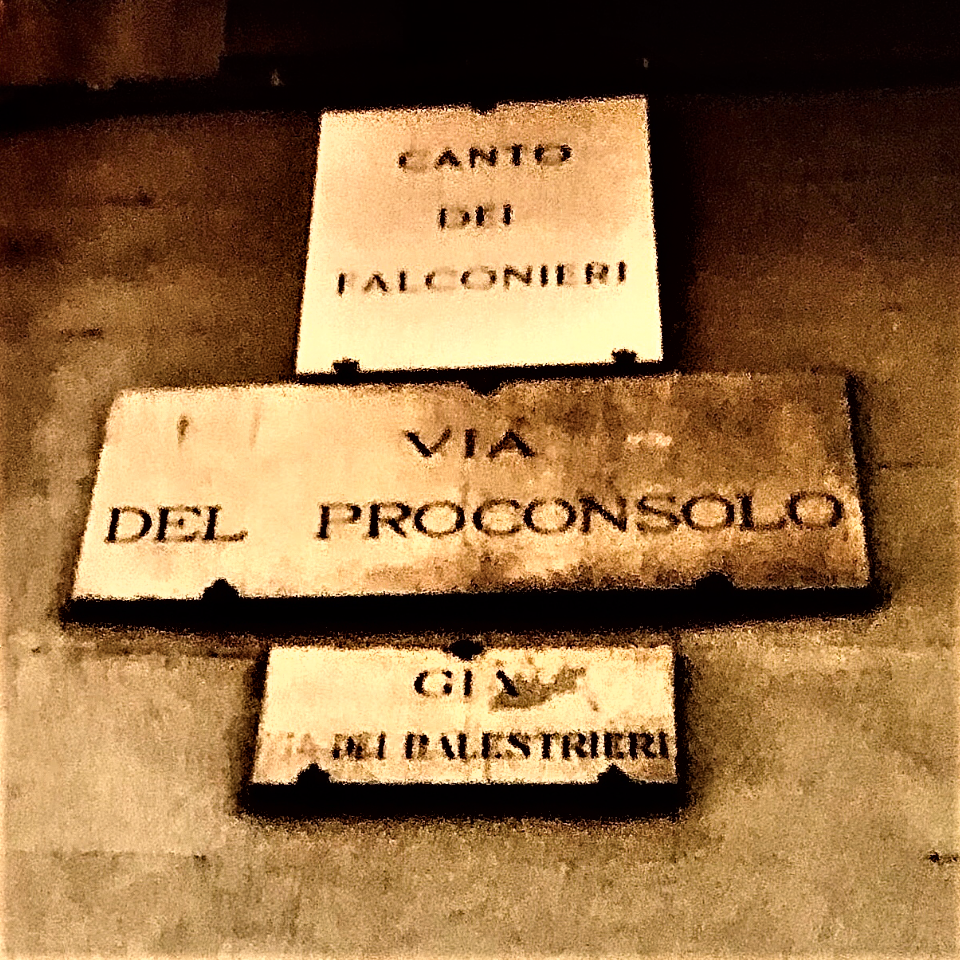
Placard of the Via dei Balestrièri, the street connecting the Piazza del Duomo (Canto de' Bischeri at the modern day corner of the Via dell'Oriuolo) to the Canto de' Pazzi (modern day Borgo degli Albizzi/Via del Corso), renamed Via del Proconsolo in 1382

Family tombs are listed within the Basilica of Santa Croce, Florence and Sant'Ambrogio, Florence. In ancient times, the family resided on the Via de' Balestrièri (since 1382 known as Via del Proconsolo) connecting the Piazza del Duomo to the Arno River.

The eldest branch of the House is today headed by Count Federico Balestrièri of Brescia. All male descendants of the Parmese branch bear the title of Count. The House is duly registered with the Consulta Araldica and is listed in the Libro d'Oro della Nobilta Italiana.

== Notable members ==
Some notable members of the family include:

- Simone Balestrièri (1408), Parma, Notary, Treasurer of Parma
- Taccio dei Balestrièri, who in 1414, at the cost of 400 Florins, had the Church of Saints Iacopo e Filippo (Sts. James and Philip) built in Florence so that the pilgrims and sick of the adjacent hospital could receive spiritual help.
- Francesco Gherardini de' Balestrièri, who as Provost Prior of the Signoria, on Easter Sunday 2 April 1419, in the Church of Santa Maria Novella, received the Golden Rose from Pope Martin V during the Pontiff's solemn visit to Florence, after which the name "della Rosa" was attributed to his descendants.
- Domenico Balestrieri, 15th-century painter from Ascoli Piceno, Italy
- Marquess Francesco Domenico Balestrièri, Patrician of Ancona in the 15th century
- Domenico Lippi de' Balestrièri, Judge in Ancona in the 15th century.
- Ser Matteo di Tuccio di Giovanni Balestrièri, Notary at the election of the Priors of Florence on 1 July 1424 (DCCXCIX)
- Marco Balestrièri, Notary in Parma in 1425, son of Notary Simone (1408)
- Genesio Balestrièri, Notary in Parma in 1431, son of Notary Simone (1408)
- Archbishop Antonio Balestrièri, O.Cist. of Amalfi, created Abbot of the Abbey of San Galgano in Tuscany and Archbishop of Amalfi on 15 June 1513 by Pope Leo X
- Marco Balestrièri, in 1541, Miniaturist of the Ordinationes of the Archvio di Stato di Parma
- Ser Angelo Balestrièri, in 1559, Notary in Siena, author of the manuscript, "Deliberazioni e provvedimenti dei deputati sopra l'ornato per la venuta in Siena del Duca Cosimo de' Medici, 1559-1561"
- Orazio (1575-1612), Doctor Utriusque Iuris 19 December 1575, Governor of Altamura, Castellamare
- Marquess Martinozzo Balestrièri, Knight of the Sovereign Military Order of Saint Stephen of Tuscany, 26 March 1582
- Giulio Balestrièri, Anziano of Parma, Knight of the Sovereign Military Order of St. Stephen of Tuscany, enrolled on 24 June 1583
- Ferrante Balestrièri (1586-1627), Parma, Doctor Utriusque Iuris, renowned lawyer and jurisconsult
- Genesio Balestrièri, in 1593 Podesta of Valli dei Cavalieri in the Duchy of Parma
- Francesco Balestrièri, Parma, Doctor Utriusque Iuris, 16th-century canon of the Cathedral of Parma
- Marquess Vincenzo Balestrièri, Knight of the Sovereign Military Order of Saint Stephen of Tuscany, 15 April 1623; Knight Commander in 1647
- Angelo Maria Francesco Balestrièri, born in Parma 4 October 1611, son of Ferrante and Orsola Galli, doctor of law
- Vincenzo Balestrièri, created Knight of the Sovereign Military Order of Saint Stephen of Tuscany in 1666
- Antonio Balestrièri, created Knight of the Sovereign Military Order of Malta on 29 April 1627
- Gabriello Balestrièri, Parma 1634/1644, painter, art restorer, Artistic Counsellor to Duke Francesco I of Modena
- Fr. Vincenzo Balestrièri, 17th-century Neapolitan Jesuit priest
- Fr. Ortenzio Balestrièri, S.J., (1671 – 1748), Jesuit author of treatises on Ignatian Spiritual Exercises and Method for Obtainment of a Good Death
- Pietro Giovanni Biagio Balestrièri (3 February 1683-post 1750), Parma, Poet enrolled in Academy of Florence
- Domenico Balestrieri, (Milan, 16 April 1714 – Milan, 11 May 1780), a famous Italian philosopher and poet
- Giovanni Maria Balestrièri, in 1700 Podestà of Borgo San Donnino
- Fulvio Balestrièri, Parma, Commissioned Field Knight on 25 November 1772, Lieutenant Colonel on 28 June 1783
- Tommaso Balestrieri, 18th-century Dominican cardinal
- Fr. Odoardo Balestrièri, Priest, Court Theologian of the Duchy of Parma 15 January 1711; Judge of Letters Patent
- Piergiovanni Balestrièri. Nobile Parmigiano in 1711, author of "L'Arcade, Favola Boschereccia". Parma: Giuseppe Rosati, 1713, dedicated to Louis XIV King of France and Navarre.
- Giuseppe Balestrièri, versifier and traveler received in all the Courts of Europe, admired for his elegance and refinery
- Count Fulvio Balestrièri. Fulvio was Field Knight on 25 November 1772, Lieutenant Colonel on 28 June 1783 (Parma)
- Count Vincenzo Balestrièri. Magistrate in the dukedom of Parma died in 1814 was buried in the church of San Pellegrino in Vigheffio (Parma)
- Tommaso Balestrieri, the famous 18th-century luthier and violin-maker from Mantua, Italy
- Count Genesio Balestrièri, 18th-century military officer in the service of the Duke of Parma
- Marquess Balestrièri, 19th-century Sicilian landowner (Palermo)
- Lionello Balestrieri (1872– 1958) Italian painter and engraver
- Augusto Balestrièri (1876-1953), Inventor of a brevetted locomotive (Paris, 1921)
- Capt. Arturo Balestrièri (1894-1979), Parma, Captain of Artillery in World War I
- Count Dr. Federico Balestrieri (1910-1972), medical doctor, philanthropist (Brescia)
- Count Avv. Stefano Balestrièri (1939-2022), attorney (Brescia)
- Count Dr. Genesio Balestrièri (1940-2022), scientist and medical doctor (Brescia)
- Cmdr. Giorgio Ugo Balestrièri (Ret.) (1943-), born in Pisa, Italian Naval Intelligence officer who unmasked nine Soviet spies attempting to steal a top secret NATO radar system. Granted U.S. citizenship, became President of the Rotary Club of New York.
- Luca Balestrièri (1953 -), director and producer at RAI television network (Rome)
- Dr. Fabrizio Balestrièri, neurologist, neuro-physiopathologist, toxicologist at Pietro Palagi Hospital (Florence)
- Gian Piero Balestrièri (1968- ), international lawyer, private banker, philanthropist (Washington D.C.)
- John Joseph Balestrieri, Jr. (1968- ), Former CTO Ogilvy (Winston-Salem, NC)
- Federica Balestrieri (22 July 1969- ), journalist at RAI Television (Rome)
- Count Dr. Federico Balestrièri (14 December 1989- ) (Brescia)
- Alex Balestrieri (10 June 1979- ) Spectacle Theatre Director, Redmoon Theatre; NewMoon Theater (Chicago)
