= Gambarini =

Gambarini is a surname. Notable people with the surname include:

- Elisabetta de Gambarini (1730–1765), English composer, pianist, conductor, and painter
- Roberta Gambarini (born 1965), Italian jazz singer
- Giuseppe Gambarini (1680–1725), Italian painter
