= Giuseppe Gambarini =

Italian painter (1680–1725)

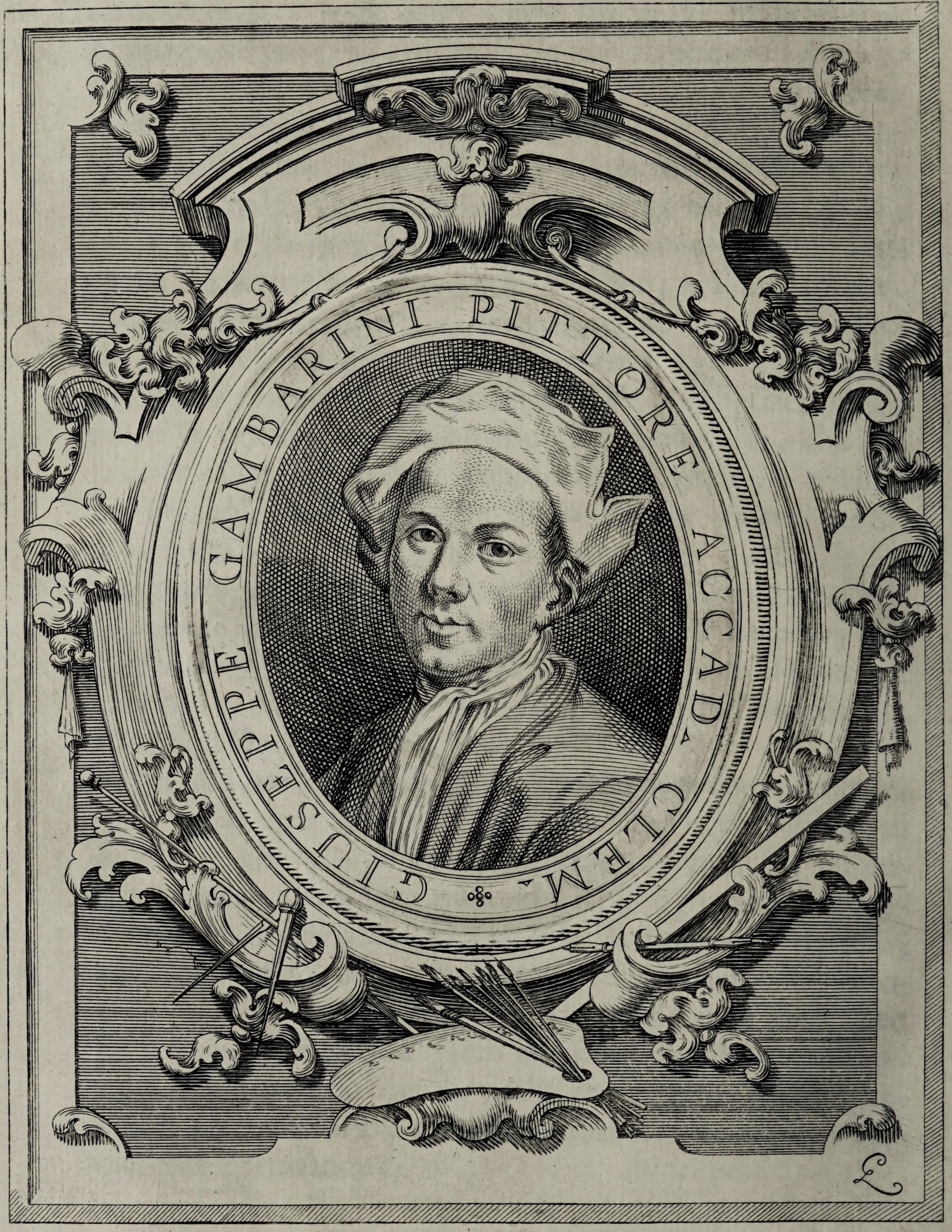
- Giuseppe Gambarini
- Born: 1680; Bologna, Papal States
- Died: September 11, 1725 (aged 44–45); Casalecchio di Reno, Papal States
- Known for: Painting
- Movement: Late-Baroque

Giuseppe Gambarini (1680 – 11 September 1725) was an Italian painter of the late-Baroque period, active mainly in Bologna. He was a pupil of the painters Lorenzo Pasinelli and Cesare Gennari.

== Biography ==
Knowledge of this charter-member of the Accademia Clementina comes almost wholly from Giampietro Zanotti, who knew Gambarini personally, and had used him as a model when the artist was in his early adolescence. Gambarini’s was a fairly short career; at the time of his unexpected death he was gaining prominence in Bologna as a specialist in scenes of working-class domestic life.

=== Early life and education ===
Gambarini came from a family of humble origins; he began his study of painting with a minor pupil, a certain Boccia (Zanotti), of the distinguished Bolognese master Lorenzo Pasinelli. Diligent study and some association with the master himself soon advanced him to the status of ‘molto buon pittore’ (Zanotti). He next worked in the studio of Benedetto Gennari II, recently returned to Bologna from a long period of residence at the courts of the English monarchs Charles II and James II, and assimilated something of Gennari’s manner.

According to Zanotti, his first independent work was a mural commission (1698) in the Casa Tassoni at Ferrara, in which as figure painter he collaborated with a quadratura specialist, producing a work that was ‘much esteemed’. Then, again as figurista, he teamed up with the celebrated quadraturista Marcantonio Chiarini to decorate a ceiling in the Casa Supini at Bergamo. Chiarini was so impressed with Gambarini’s ability that he invited him to collaborate on an important large-scale palace decoration in Vienna. Unfortunately his work with Chiarini encountered malicious comment and the hypersensitive Gambarini returned to Bologna, leaving his colleague to find another painter.

=== Mature work ===
In 1712–13 Gambarini worked in Rome, with the quadraturista Pompeo Aldrovandini, on a decorative commission in Santi Giovanni Evangelista e Petronio. He then returned permanently to Bologna, where he occasionally received commissions for altarpieces but more frequently private commissions for narrative pictures. Examples are Hagar and Ishmael in the Desert (Prague, National Museum) or the two quite beautiful pastoral mythologies, the Birth of Adonis and its companion, the Nurture of Jupiter (Bologna, Maccafferi priv. col.), painted for Conte Raimondo Buonaccorsi of Macerata.

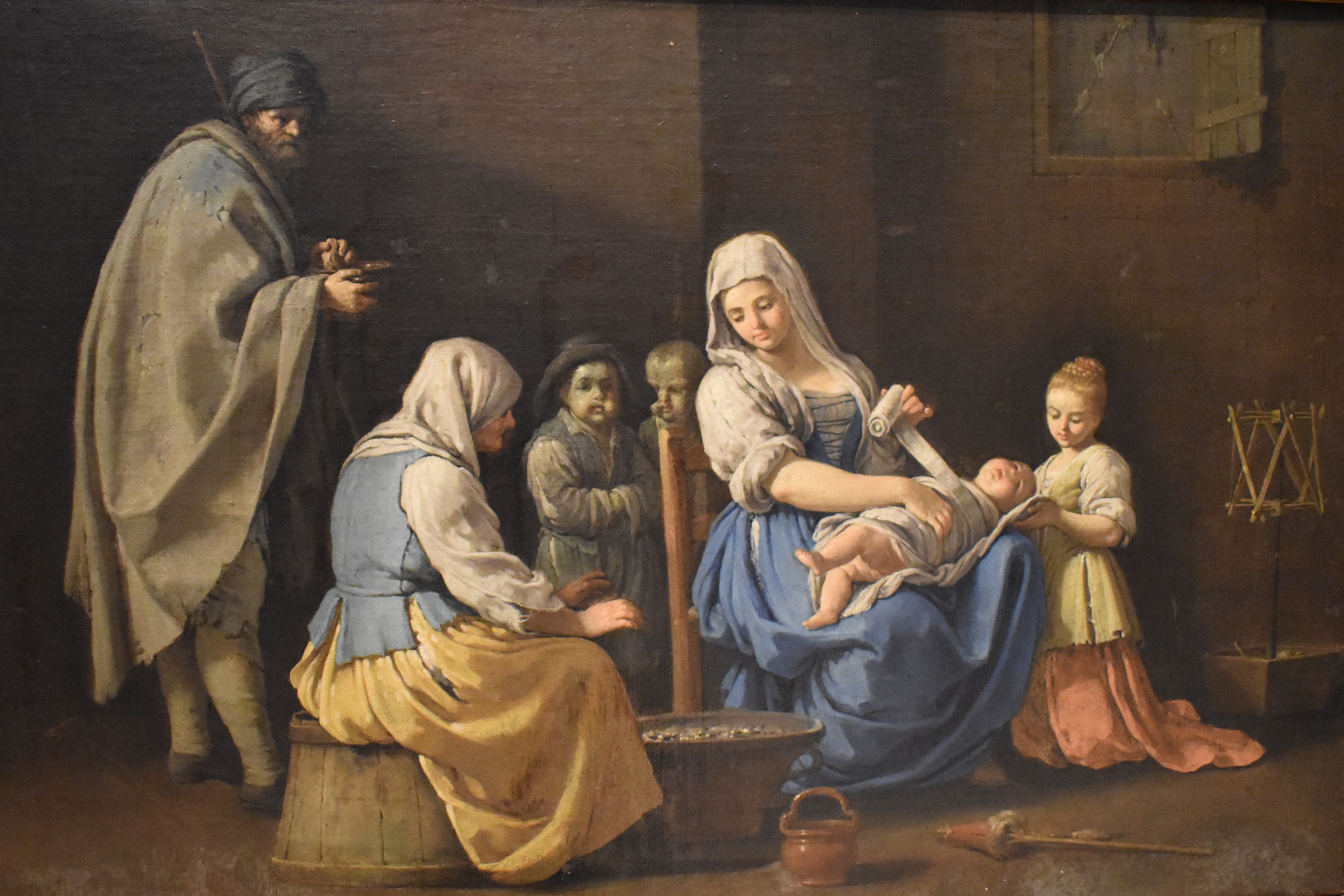
The Winter, Pinacoteca of Bologna

Gambarini took great pleasure in making studies of the incidents of life about him in Bologna and especially the daily scene in his own family. Through these exercises he discovered his true métier as a painter of genre subjects. His, generally cabinet-sized, pictures of ‘soggetti umili e bassi’ (Zanotti), observed with an amused but compassionate eye and demonstrating a sure touch and sharp characterization, soon became popular with local patrician collectors, rivalling pictures of this type by the better-known Giuseppe Crespi.

Towards the end of his career, however, he received a commission for two large history paintings from Count Vincenzo Ranuzzi, who wanted two multi-figured scenes celebrating Charles V’s visit to Bologna to hang in his senatorial palace. Gambarini died in Bologna on 11 September 1725. One of his pupils was Stefano Gherardini, who imitated Gambarini's manner.

== Gallery ==
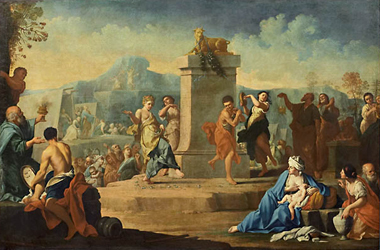
Dance around Golden Calf, National Museum of Serbia

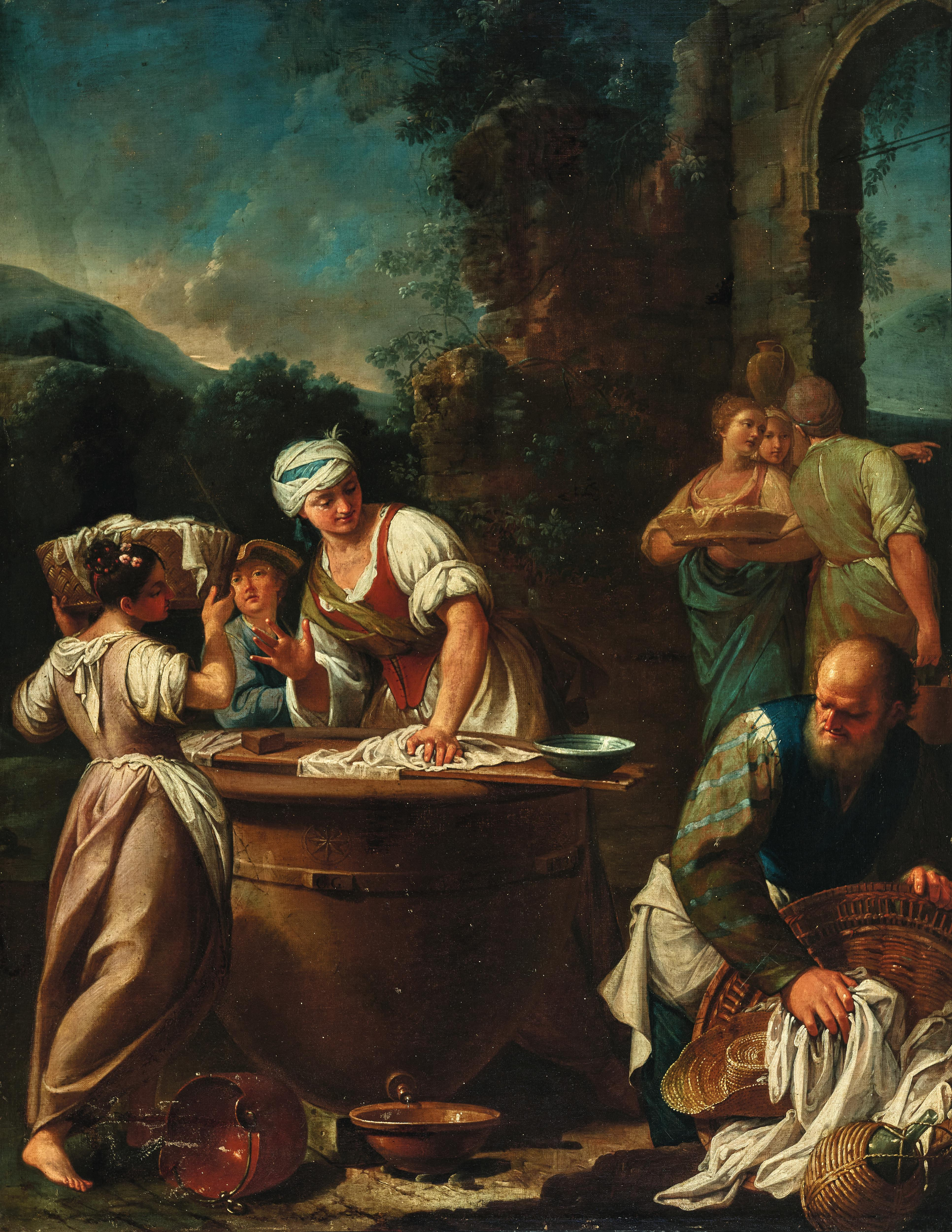
Washerwomen

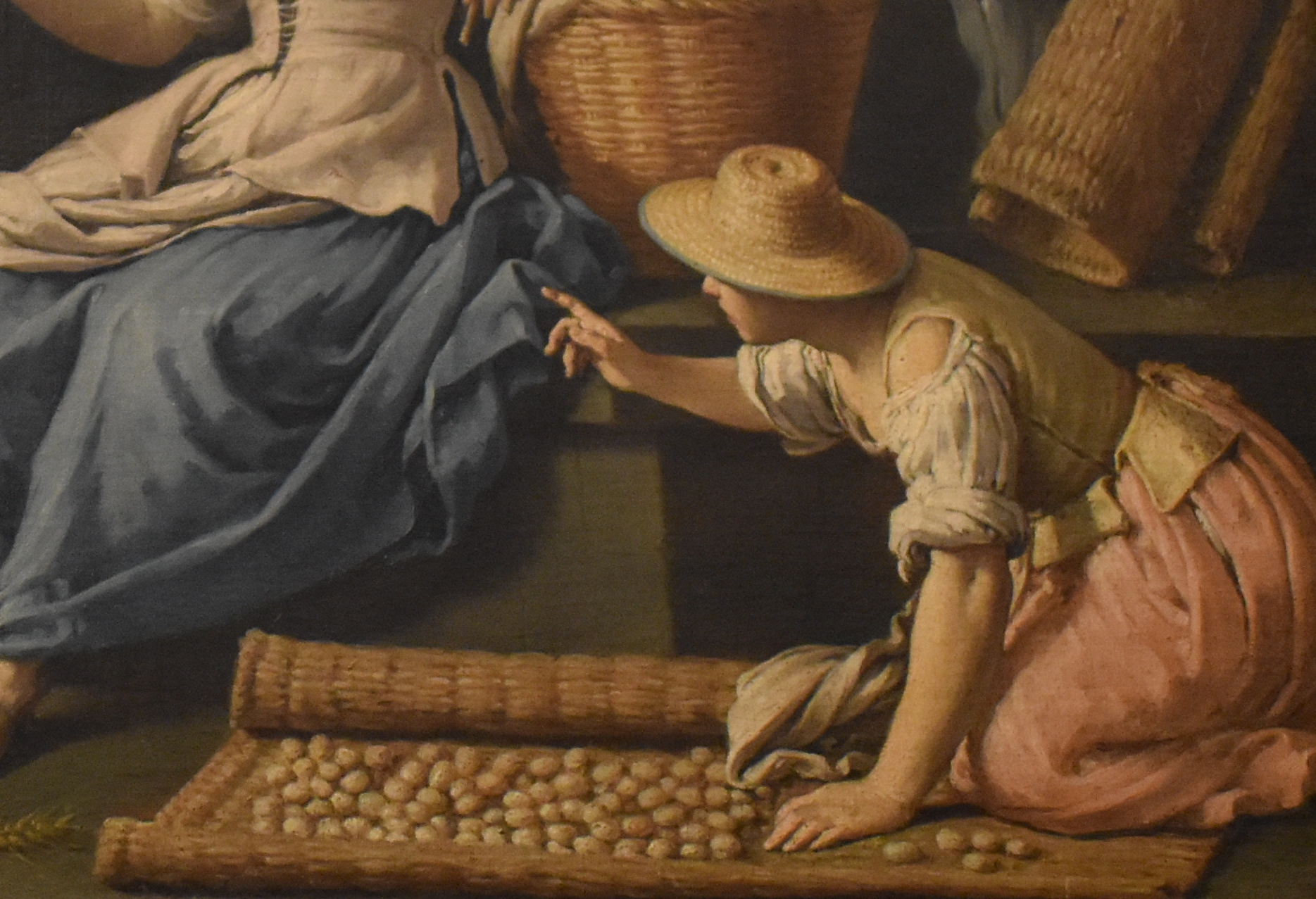
Autumn (Detail)

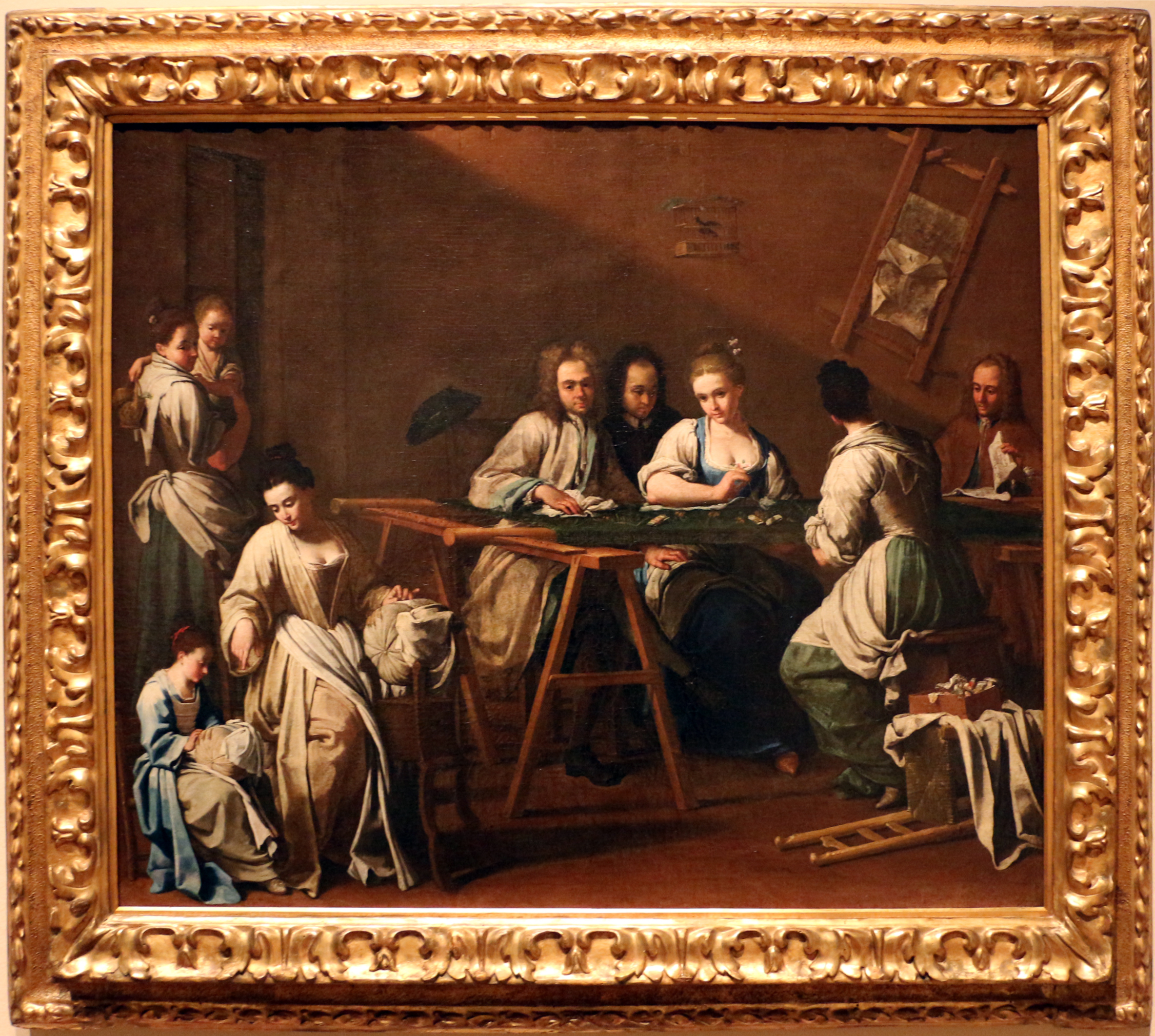
Ricamatori e ricamatrici, National Museum of Ancient Art, Lisboa

== Bibliography ==
- Zanotti, Giampietro (1739). Storia dell’Accademia Clementina. Vol. I. Bologna. pp. 387–92.
- Crespi, Luigi (1769). Felsina pittrice: Vite de’ pittori bolognesi. Rome. p. 140.
- Voss, Hermann (1928). "Giuseppe Gambarini". Pantheon: Internationale Zeitschrift für Kunst. 2: 512–15.
- Farquhar, Maria (1855). Ralph Nicholson Wornum (ed.). Biographical catalogue of the principal Italian painters. London: Woodfall & Kinder. p. 68.
