= Jacopo Schettini Gherardini =

Italian economist

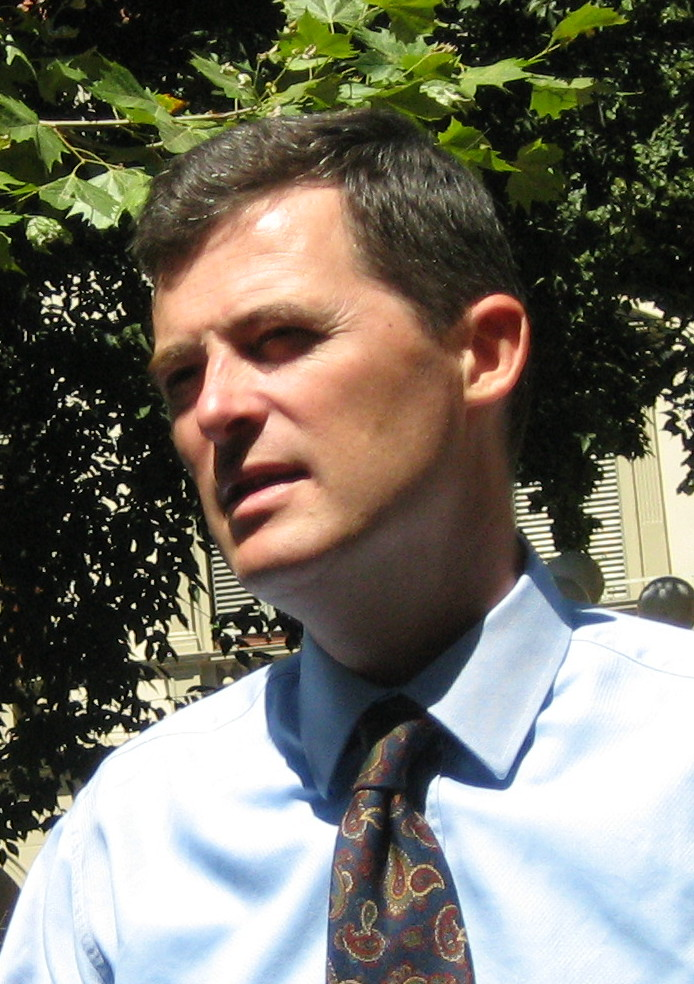
Jacopo Schettini-Gherardini

Jacopo Schettini Gherardini (born 11 February 1965) is an Italian economist. He was a Candidate for the National Secretariat of the Democratic Party (Italy) during the primary elections of 2007. He is currently the Executive Director of Standard Ethics Aei based in London.

He started his professional career in the international financial markets working for the Hong Kong and Shanghai Banking Corporation Group (HSBC) in London. He also worked for several other banks before joining Standard Ethics Aei in Brussels in 2001. Then, he began to focus intensely on such issues as corporate governance, corporate social responsibility and sustainable development, together with ethical finance.

On 3 July 2007 he was the second national candidate, after Walter Veltroni, in the Italian Democratic Party primary elections. During His campaign he coined the “green-white-red” idea for the dawning party. This idea is now contained in the official declaration for the presentation of the symbol of the Democratic Party (Italy), made the following November. He took part in drafting the Democratic Party’s Ethical Code, collaborating directly with the drafting Commission (with Sergio Mattarella as President, current President of Italy, and Marcella Lucidi as rapporteur).

Jacopo is member of the Gherardini family of Montagliari.

== Education ==
- 1992: Graduate in political sciences (University of Florence)
- 2010: Ph.D. in Corporate Finance (Doctoral School of Finance, University of Trieste)

== Career ==
- 1992-1994: HSBC
- 1994-1996: IMI Bank (at the time, was under the control of the Italian Ministry of the Treasure before being privatised and subsequently merging with Sanpaolo)
- 1996-2000: Ifigest Bank
- 2001-2013: CEO of AEI and Directeur Exécutif of Standard Ethics Aei
- 2013-to date: Executive Director of Standard Ethics
