= Vox Angeli =

Vox Angeli were a French junior vocal group founded 2008 and disbanded 2011. The group recorded on Sony Music Entertainment and was inspired by the commercial success of Simon Cowell's similar UK project with six children Angelis, which ran from 2006-2007, but in the case of Vox Angeli singing French songs. The French group had more success than the UK original and were able to record with major French artists including Charles Aznavour and Calogero. As of 2014, Vox Angeli has returned and released a new album titled: Amour et Paix.

== Discography ==
=== Albums ===
| Year | Album | Peak positions | | |
| Year | Album | FR | BEL (Wa) | SUI |
|---|---|---|---|---|
| 2008 | Vox Angeli | 2 | 4 | 29 |
| 2008 | Imagine | 18 | 21 | 84 |
| 2009 | Gloria | 45 | 47 | – |
| 2010 | Irlande | 75 | – | – |
| 2014 | Amour et Paix | 74 | – | – |

Others

- 2009: Viox Angeli / Imagine (rerelease: FR: #74)
