= Marie-Louise Victoire Girardin =

French Sailor (1754–1794)

- Born: 29 June 1754; Versailles, France
- Died: 18 December 1794 (aged 40)
- Occupation: Ship's Steward
- Spouse: Etienne Lesserteur (m. 1776–1781)

Marie-Louise Victoire Girardin (29 June 1754 – 18 December 1794) also known as Louis Girardin was a Frenchwoman, who disguised as a man became a sailor and joined an expedition of discovery to Australia and the South Pacific.

== Early life ==
Marie-Louise Victoire Girardin was born 29 June 1754 in the parish of Saint-Louis, Versailles, France, one of nine children of Jean Girardin and Angélique Benoise (née Hanet). Marie-Louise married Etienne Lesserteur in 1776, their only child Jean died 14 April 1778 and her husband died 14 July 1781.

After giving birth to an illegitimate child, Marie-Louise disguised herself as a man and fled to Brest with a letter of introduction to the widowed sister of Jean-Michel Huon de Kermadec. Huon de Kermadec helped her to find a post as a steward, under the name of Louis Girardin, on board the 80-gun ship Deux Frères. When the crew threatened mutiny, Huon de Kermadec helped her to transfer to Recherche, which was about to leave in search of La Pérouse, whose expedition was last seen leaving Botany Bay, Australia in January 1788.

== Voyage to the South Seas ==
Recherche, under Antoine Bruni d'Entrecasteaux's command and Espérance, under Huon de Kermadec's command, sailed from Brest in September 1791.

She served dressed as a male, and is known as the first known white European woman to have set foot in the Van Diemen's Land (23 April 1792), New Caledonia and several other places around the Australian Archipelago. Her gender was an open secret on the ship. She had a love affair with a colleague, Ensign Mérite, during the journey, but she was not officially exposed. When she was, at one occasion, openly accused of being female by a colleague, she fought a duel with him. She was finally exposed after death by the ship's surgeon on her way back to Europe.

Her story was told in La Motte du Portail journal.
