= Mario Adinolfi =

Italian politician (born 1971)

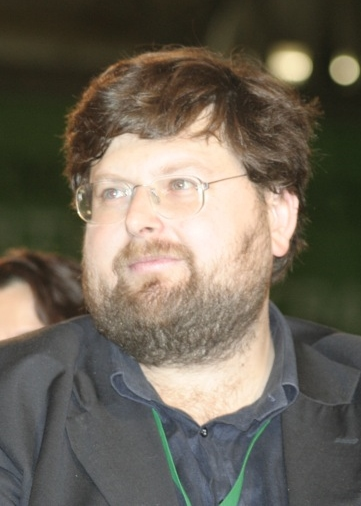

Member of the Chamber of Deputies
- In office 13 June 2012 – 14 March 2013
- Constituency: Lazio 1

Personal details
- Born: 15 August 1971 (age 54) Rome, Italy
- Party: DC (before 1994); PPI (1994–2002); DL (2002–2007); PD (2007–2013); PdF (since 2016)
- Height: 1.92 m (6 ft 4 in)
- Spouse: Elena Banzi (m. 1990; div. 2001) Silvia Pardolesi (m. 2013)
- Children: 1
- Profession: Journalist

Mario Adinolfi (born 15 August 1971) is an Italian journalist, politician and poker player. He is famous in Italy for his Catholic beliefs.

== Biography ==
He was born in Rome to Ugo Adinolfi and a woman of Australian descent.

Adinolfi graduated in history. He has been a journalist since the late 1980s, writing for the newspapers Avvenire, Europa, Il Popolo and La Discussione. He also worked for the Radio Vaticana.

He was a journalist for the RAI, where he is the author and presenter of several programs. He had a brief program at MTV Italia, Pugni in Tasca, aired from 2007 to 2008.

He also has worked in radio and has a programme on Radio Maria since February 2015.

He was the founder and is the director of the newspaper La Croce, on 21 October 2014, available online and also briefly in a purchasable edition from 13 January to 16 May 2015.

== Political career ==
Adinolfi started as a Christian Democracy member, but after the party dissolution, he joined the newly created centre-left Italian People's Party, being the youngest member of their constituent assembly in 1993, aged 22 years old. He was elected national president of the Popular Youth of the party in 1994, joining soon the national executive of the PPI. He founded the movement Direct Democracy to run for mayor of Rome in the administrative elections of 13 May 2001. He supported Walter Veltroni in the second round of the elections.

He was a co-founder of the Democratic Party, being a candidate for the party leadership on 18 July 2007. He had 5906 votes, entering by his own right the constituent assembly of the party, which elected him for the commission that wrote their statute. He was also a member of the national direction of the PD.

He was a candidate of the PD at the legislative elections of 13–14 April 2008, in Lazio circunscrition, at number 18, but wasn't elected. He was a candidate for the national secretary of the PD on 25 June 2009. He became a member of the Italian Chamber of Deputies on 13 June 2012, replacing Pietro Tidei, which he was until 14 March 2013. In 2012, he was one of the first Italian parliamentarians to ask for a diplomatic intervention of Europe in the Syrian civil war.

In March 2016 he founded The People of the Family, a social conservative party. The party was accused by many political commentators of being a Christian fundamentalist movement.

Adinolfi became quite famous in Italy for his controversial statement. He created a lot of protests when he stated that women must be submissive to men, as written in the Holy Bible, and that Adolf Hitler was less dangerous than people who supported euthanasia, because he killed disabled people for free. In May 2017, Adinolfi presented the French President Emmanuel Macron as a Freemason.

In 2014, Adinolfi published the book titled Voglio la mamma e La Croce with the Youcanprint publishing house, a book in which he invited the Italian center-left position to take the role of defensors of the weakest persons like newborns (in respect of abortion, same-sex marriage and surrogacy of maternity), the elderlies (euthanasia).

In November 2018, he publicly defended an Italian writer, psychologist and psychiatrist, with 40 years of professional activity, that have affirmed homosexuality is an illness and not a normal condition. The municipality of Turin supported the judiciary against her.

In June 2021, he publicly commented Black Lives Matter symbolism, shown and practised by volunteering football players during football matches played in UEFA Euro 2020, as ridiculous.

== Accusation of fraud and tax evasion ==
On July 8, 2026 Mario Adinolfi has been placed under house arrest on charges of fraud and tax evasion. The investigation concerns a collective sports betting scheme he promoted from 2005, in which participants invested from €3,000 to €150,000. Prosecutors allege that several investors never recovered their money or received the promised returns. The scheme is estimated to have caused around €5 million in losses, with an additional €400,000 in unpaid taxes.

== Books ==
Adinolfi has already published several books, including Email: Lettera della Generazione Invisibile (1998), Mundial, o, Della Perdita dell'Innocenza (2004), a novel, Il Conclave (2005), Generazione U (2007), and Voglio la Mamma (2014), against what he calls "the false myths of progress", including abortion, euthanasia, same-sex marriage and surrogate motherhood.
