= André Gérardin =

French mathematician (1879–1953)

André Gérardin (1879, Nancy, Meurthe-et-Moselle – 1953, Nancy, Meurthe-et-Moselle) was a French mathematician, specializing in number theory and calculating machines used in factoring large positive integers, finding primes, and calculating quadratic residues modulo a given positive integer.

Gérardin became a member of the Société Mathématique de France in 1906. He wrote many articles for L'Enseignement Mathématique, Nouvelles Annales de Mathématiques, and other French mathematical journals, as well as a few articles for foreign mathematical journals. He was one of nine mathematicians who read the initial page proofs and suggested improvements for the first volume of Leonard E. Dickson's History of the Theory of Numbers. In that volume, Dickson and Gérardin announced for the first time that the Mersenne number M_{173} has the factor 730753.

Gérardin was an Invited Speaker of the ICM in 1912 at Cambridge UK, in 1920 at Strasbourg, in 1928 at Bologna, and in 1932 at Zürich. He was the founder and editor for many years of the mathematical review Sphinx-Oedipe, started in 1906. In 1944 he, along with Paul Belgodère, started the journal Intermédiarie des Recherches Mathématiques. In 1948 Gérardin started publishing the journal Diophante and continued with it until his death.

In 1949, Paul Belgodère, the director (from 1949 to 1986) of the Institut Henri Poincaré, purchased the important mathematical library that Gérardin had accumulated at Nancy.
