= Alessandro Rosi =

Italian painter (1627–1697)

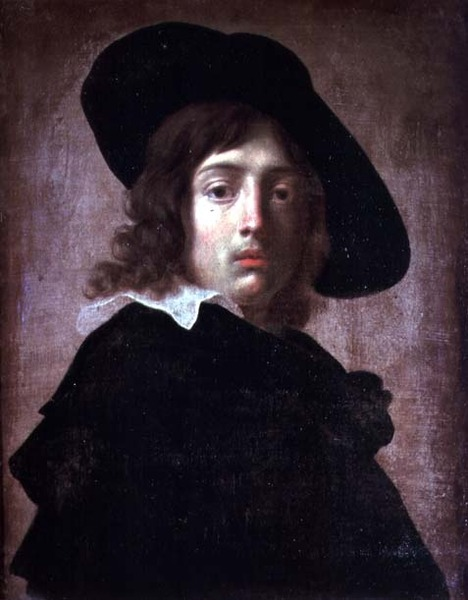
Self-portrait, 1660

Alessandro Rosi (28 December 1627 in Rovezzano – 19 April 1697 in Florence) was an Italian artist, working during the Baroque period, for the Medicis and other patrons.

== Biography ==
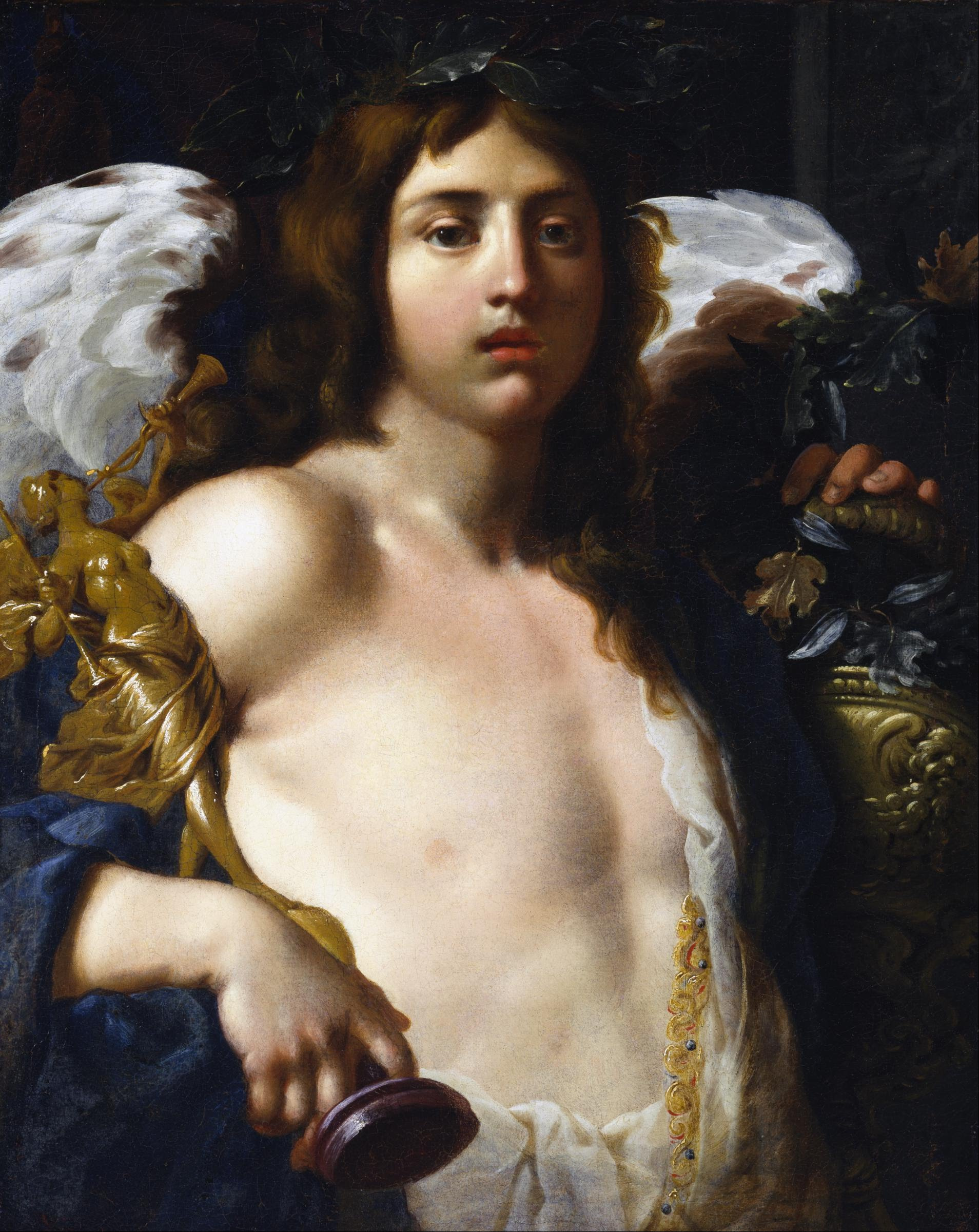
Love of Virtue, oil on canvas, between 1627 and 1696

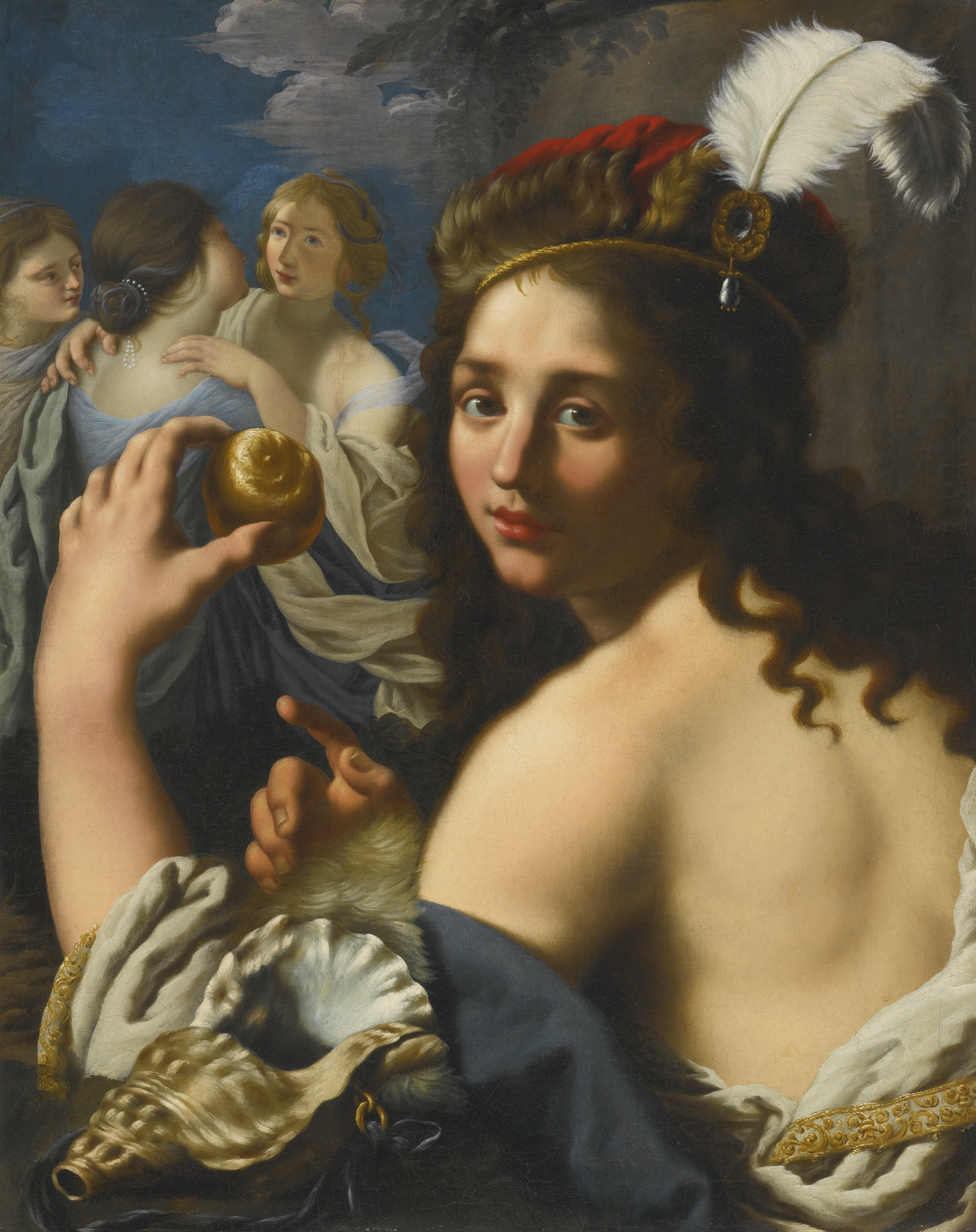
The Judgement of Paris, oil on canvas

Rosi trained in the workshops of Jacopo Vignali and Cesare Dandini, along with other young Florentine artists such as Carlo Dolci. It seems that he undertook a study trip to Rome, where he saw the work of Simon Vouet and Giovanni Lanfranco. In his early works the influence of his teacher Dandini can be seen, especially in the treatment of drapery, to which the latter always paid great attention. His biographer Baldinucci described him as having the extravagant temperament of an artist. Rosi enjoyed the patronage of some of the most important Florentine families of the time, such as the Corsini or Rinuccini families, for which he undertook large decorative projects. He also made a series of ten designs for tapestries commissioned by Cosimo III de' Medici, Grand Duke of Tuscany. His foremost pupil was Alessandro Gherardini. He died at the age of seventy after being struck by a falling column while walking along the Via Condotta in Florence.

Little is known of his life. Only the single full-length study of his oeuvre brought him to the forefront. His work previously tended to be confused with that of other artists such as Sigismondo Coccapini. His work has undergone a re-evaluation by critics in recent years, after centuries of oblivion.

== Paintings ==
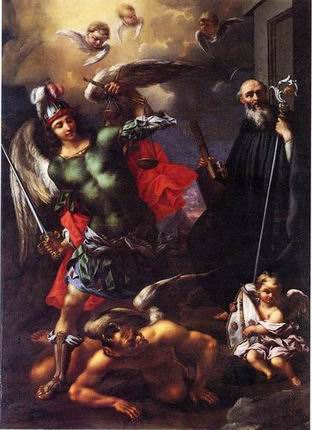
Archangel Michael, and St. Benedict, ca. 1665

- Santa con ángel niño (1646, private collection)
- Frescos del Palazzo Corsini (1650-1653, Florence), by the quadraturista Bartolomeo Neri.
- Self-portrait (c. 1660, Uffizi, Florence)
- Saint Benedict and Michael Archangel (1665, Monastero di San Clemente (Prato)
- Ecstasy of St Mary Magdalen de'Pazzi (c. 1669, Musée des beaux-arts de Chambéry)
- Ecstasy of St Mary Magdalen de'Pazzi (private collection)
- Angelic Musicians (1671, Santissima Annunziata, Florence), fresco.
- Adoration of the Magi (private collection, Florence)
- Death of Cleopatra (c. 1685, private collection)
- Moses and the Daughter of Jethro (Cariprato, Prato)
- Moses brings water from rock (Cariprato, Prato)
- Aparition of Virgen to Saints Isidro and Antony Abott Chiesa dei Santi Maria e Bartolomeo a Padule
- Ceres (Christian Museum, Esztergom)
- Miracle of St Catherine of Siena (Santa Maria, Cascina)
- Witchcraft Scene (private collection, Florence)
- Hagar and Angel (private collection)
- Virgen and Angel with fruit bowl (private collection)
- St Hieronymus (private collection)
- Ste Apolonia (private collection)
- Incredulity of St Thomas (private collection)
- Ste Lucy (missing)
- Ste Margaret (Luzzetti, Florence)
- Ste Cecilia (missing)
- Ste Cristina (San Michele Arcangelo, Passignano)
