= Sébastien Gérardin =

French naturalist (1751–1816)

Sébastien Gérardin (9 March 1751 in Mirecourt – 17 July 1816 in Paris) was a French naturalist.

After training for the priesthood, Sébastien Gérardin became canon of Poussay in 1790. He was passionately interested in natural history, which he taught at l’École centrale d'Épinal. There he assembled a cabinet of curiosities as well as the botanical garden. He was employed by the Muséum national d'histoire naturelle in Paris from 1803.

== Works ==
- 1784 : Lettre d'un Anglois à un François sur la découverte du magnétisme animal, et observations sur cette lettre, A. Bouillon ed.
- 1805 : Tableau élémentaire de botanique (Perlet, Paris).
- 1806 : Tableau élémentaire d'ornithologie, ou Histoire naturelle des oiseaux que l'on rencontre communément en France (Tourneisen fils, Paris) — 2nd ed.: 1822.
- 1810 : Essai de physiologie végétale: ouvrage dans lequel sont expliquées toutes les parties des végétaux: accompagné de planches et de tableaux méthodiques, représentant les trois systèmes de Tournefort, de Linné et de Jussieu at Google Books (F. Schoell, Paris, 2 volumes).
- 1817 : Dictionnaire raisonné de botanique publié, revu et augmenté... par Mr N.-A. Desvaux (Dondey-Dupré, Paris).
