= Stefano Gherardini =

Italian painter (1695–1755)

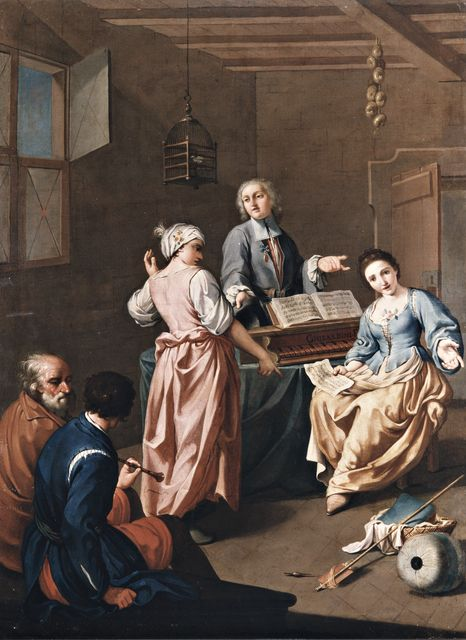
Genre scene with concert

Stefano Gherardini (1695–1755) was an Italian painter, prolific in painting genre scenes or bambocciate.

== Biography ==
He was a pupil of Giuseppe Gambarini. He was born and died in Bologna. He is described by Pietro Zani as a painter of capricci, caricatures, di pittocchi, of charlatans and all things recognized under the title of bambocciate
