= Alessandro Gherardini =

Italian painter

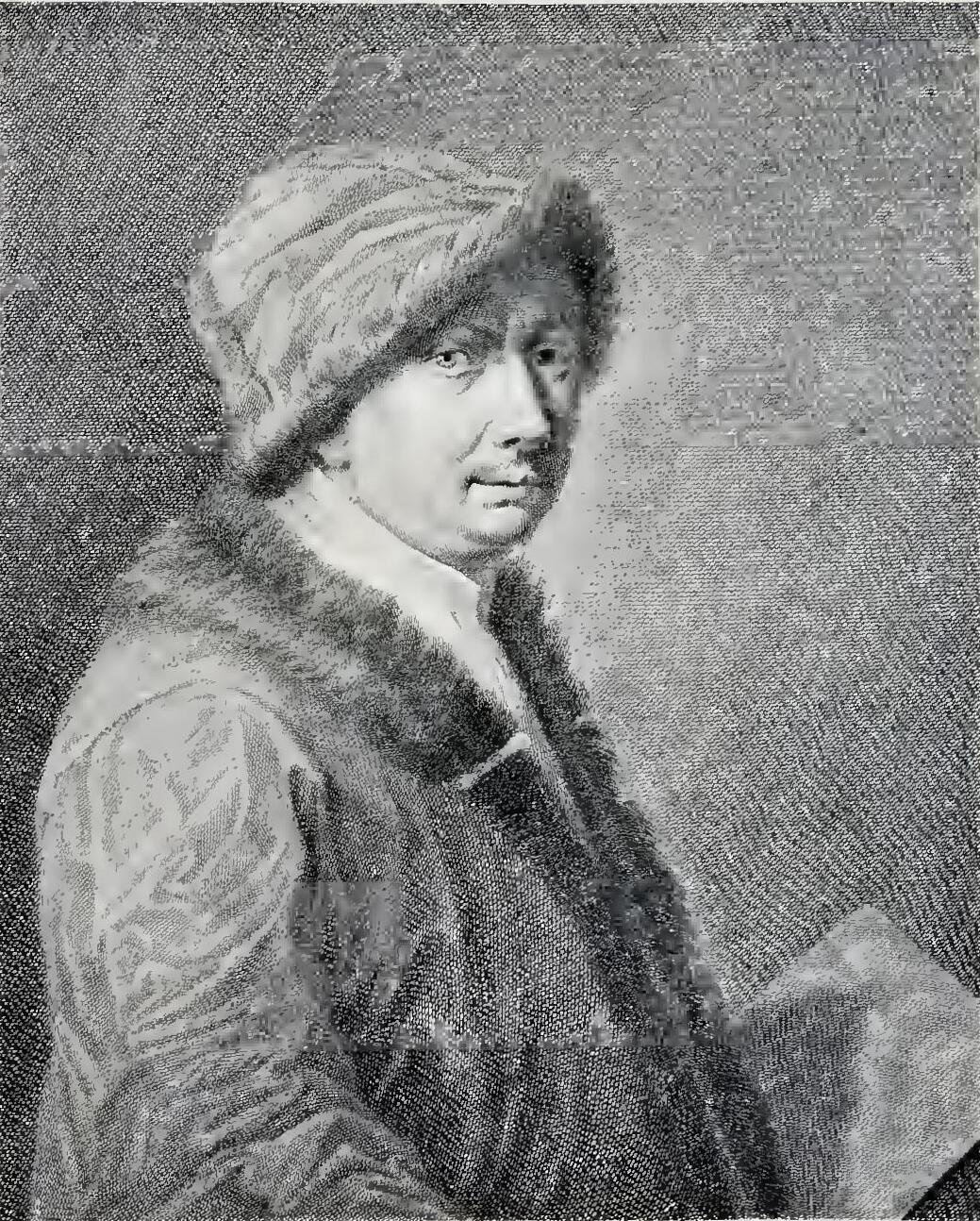
- Born: 16 November 1655; Florence
- Died: 1726 (aged 70–71)
- Occupation: Painter

Alessandro Gherardini (16 November 1655 – 1726) was an Italian painter of the Baroque period, active mainly in Florence.

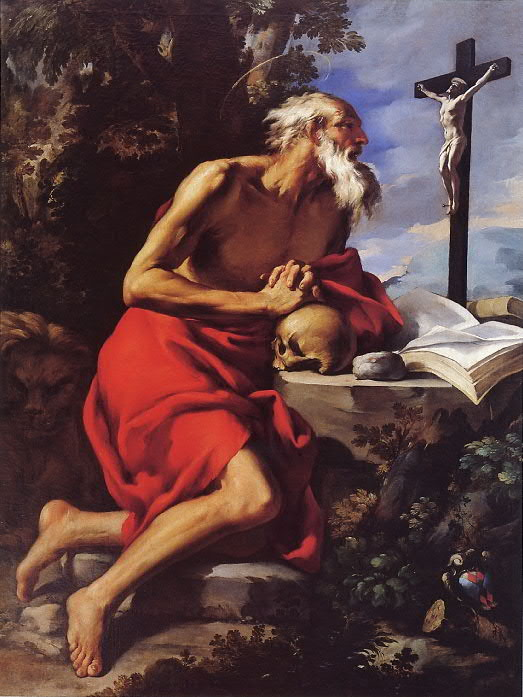
Alessandro Gherardini, Saint Jerome as penitent.

He was the pupil of the painter Alessandro Rosi. In Florence, he painted a Crucifixion for the Monastery of the Augustines adjacent to Santa Maria dei Candeli; and frescoes from the Life of St. Anthony for the Convent of San Marco. He painted frescoes on the Life of Alexander the Great for Casa Orlandini. He is described as a competitor for commissions in Florence with Anton Domenico Gabbiani. Among Gherardini's pupils was Sebastiano Galeotti, who later moved to Genoa.
