= Standard Ethics Aei =

Sustainability reporting company in London

Standard Ethics
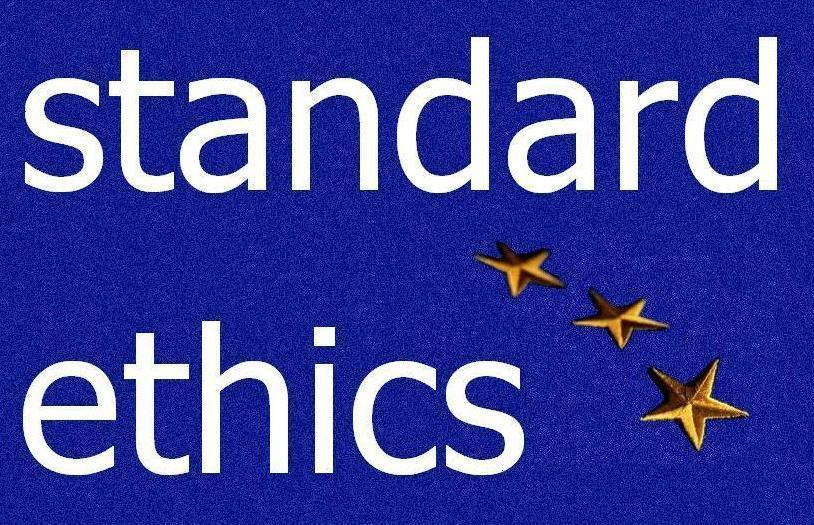
- Industry: Ratings
- Founded: 2004
- Headquarters: London, Belgium, and Italy
- Key people: Blanche Ullens de Schooten (Chairman), Jacopo Schettini Gherardini (CEO)
- Products: Solicited Sustainability Ratings
- Services: Sustainability Rating
- Website: Standard Ethics

Standard Ethics is an independent sustainability reporting rating agency based in London, known for its sustainable finance and ESG (Environmental, Social, Governance) studies. In 2001, it introduced a standardized approach to sustainability ratings. Methodologically, it separates Corporate Social Responsibility (CSR) from sustainability, seeing the latter as a global and systemic approach whose definition is not given by a single entity but by international institutions.

Standard Ethics promotes sustainability and corporate governance with the Standard Ethics Rating, an evaluation of how well companies and sovereign nations respond to corporate governance and sustainability, as indicated by guidelines published by the United Nations, the Organization for Economic Co-operation and Development, and the European Union.

The Standard Ethics Business Model is based on the applicant-pay model. Like credit rating agencies, Standard Ethics sells solicited ratings, meaning it charges applicants for ratings. Once assigned, the rating and related analysis belong to the applicant. Conversely, under the investor-pay model, agencies charge investors a fee for a list of companies that warrant investment.

== Standard Ethics Rating ==
The Standard Ethics Rating (SER) is a Solicited Sustainability Rating (SSR) evaluating how well companies and sovereign nations comply with the sustainability and corporate governance guidelines published by the United Nations (UN), the Organization for Economic Co-operation and Development (OECD), and the European Union (EU).

The rating does not use weightings and KPI-based analyses or indicators but applies a proprietary six-group variable algorithm.

Standard Ethics links the rating to an evaluation done both at a qualitative and quantitative level of the potential reputational risks for a company. This process aims to protect corporate assets, particularly corporate reputation. Companies believe that EU, OECD and UN recommendations suggest future legislative requirements. Therefore, complying with a standardized model like the SER could bring a competitive advantage.

The methodological approach of Standard Ethics was first introduced in 2001, and its ratings are based on a scale comprising nine letter grades: EEE; EEE−; EE+; EE; EE−; E+; E; E−; F; where "EEE" stands for 'above average'; "EE" for 'average'; and "E" for 'below average'.

== Standard Ethics Clusters ==
Standard Ethics' clusters (formerly known as Index or Benchmark) are designed to measure how closely ESG policies align with international sustainability guidelines.

In April 2019, Standard Ethics announced its SE European 100 Index, whose index constituents have been selected according to their dimension, in terms of market capitalization.

To date (September 2026), Standard Ethics publishes the following clusters:

- SE Belgian Cluster (composed of the 20 largest Belgium-listed companies with a Standard Ethics Rating).
- SE Dutch Cluster (composed of the 30 largest Dutch-listed companies with a Standard Ethics Rating).
- SE European 100 Cluster (composed of the 100 largest European listed companies based on market capitalization, with a Standard Ethics Rating).
- SE European Banks Cluster (composed of the 40 largest European-listed banks with a Standard Ethics Rating).
- SE European Fashion&Luxury Cluster (composed of the 20 largest European-listed companies in the sector with a Standard Ethics Rating).
- SE European Multi-Utilities Cluster (composed of the 15 largest European-listed companies in the sector with a Standard Ethics Rating).
- SE European Utilities Cluster (composed of the 30 largest European-listed companies in the sector with a Standard Ethics Rating).
- SE Food&Beverage Sustainability Italian Cluster (composed of the 30 largest Italian companies in the sector with a Standard Ethics Rating).
- SE French Cluster (composed of the 40 largest French-listed companies with a Standard Ethics Rating).
- SE German Cluster (composed of the 30 largest German-listed companies with a Standard Ethics Rating).
- SE Italian Banks Cluster (composed of the Italian-listed banks with a Standard Ethics Rating).
- SE Italian Cluster (composed of the 40 largest Italian-listed companies with a Standard Ethics Rating).
- SE Mid Italian Cluster (composed of 20 of the Italian-listed companies with the highest market capitalisation, following the largest ones).
- SE Spanish Cluster (composed of the 40 largest Spanish-listed companies with a Standard Ethics Rating).
- SE Mid Spanish Cluster (composed of 20 of the Spanish-listed companies with the highest market capitalisation, following the largest ones).
- SE UK Cluster (composed of the 50 largest British-listed companies with a Standard Ethics Rating).
- SE Unlisted Italian Banks Cluster (composed of the 25 largest Italian-unlisted banks with a Standard Ethics Rating).

The way Standard Ethics reports on its indices is based on full disclosure.

=== National Ratings ===
This is the situation for sovereign nations with a Standard Ethics Sustainability Rating as of April 2019. In 2013, Standard Ethics was the first to assign the rating to the Vatican City State.

Country	Rating	Outlook	Date
Argentina	E		October 2015
Australia	EE+		October 2015
Austria	EE−		March 2020
Belgium	EEE−		October 2015
Brazil	EE−		April 2014
Bulgaria	EE−		April 2014
Canada	EEE−		March 2018
Chile	E+		April 2014
China	E−		Nov 2018
Czech Republic	EE−		October 2016
Denmark	EEE		June 2016
Egypt	E−		April 2014
Estonia	EE−		April 2014
Finland	EEE−		October 2015
France	EEE−		April 2014
Germany	EE+		April 2014
United Kingdom	EEE−		March 2017
Greece	EE		January 2015
Hungary	E	Negative	March 2020
Iceland	EEE		April 2014
India	E	Under monitoring	April 2014
Ireland	EEE−		April 2014
Israel	E+		April 2014
Italy	EE+		March 2020
Japan	EE		April 2014
Luxembourg	EE+		October 2015
Mexico	EE−		April 2014
Netherlands	EE+		March 2020
New Zealand	EEE−		February 2018
Norway	EEE		October 2015
Poland	E		March 2020
Portugal	EE		April 2014
Romania	EE−		April 2014
Russia	F	Under monitoring	February 2022
Slovenia	EE+		October 2015
Slovakia	EE	Negative	February 2016
South Africa	EE−		October 2015
South Korea	E+	Positive	July 2016
Spain	EE+		October 2017
Sweden	EEE−		May 2020
Switzerland	EE+		March 2020
Turkey	E−	Negative	September 2017
USA	EE	Negative	Jun 2018
Vatican City	EE		April 2014
