= Shenstone Circle =

The Shenstone Circle, also known as the Warwickshire Coterie, was a literary circle of poets living in and around Birmingham in England from the 1740s to the 1760s. At its heart lay the poet and landscape gardener William Shenstone, who lived at The Leasowes in Halesowen to the west of Birmingham, and whose role as patron and mentor to Midlands poets saw him compared to the Roman patron of the arts Gaius Maecenas. Members of the group included Shenstone's near neighbour in Halesowen John Scott Hylton; John Pixell of Edgbaston; William Somervile of Edstone in Warwickshire; Lady Luxborough of Barrells Hall near Henley-in-Arden; Richard Jago of Snitterfield, whom Shenstone knew from their time together at Solihull School and John Perry of Clent.

== Bibliography ==
- Suarez, Michael F. (1997), "Who's Who in Robert Dodsley's Collection of Poems by Several Hands", in Suarez, Michael F.; Dodsley, Robert (eds.), Collection of Poems by Several Hands, vol. I, London: Routledge, pp. 120–226, ISBN 0415143829
