= John Scott Hylton =

John Scott Hylton (c. 1726 – 23 February 1793) was an English antiquary and poet, and a member of the Shenstone circle of writers that gathered around the poet and landscape gardener William Shenstone.

== Background ==
Little is known of Hylton's early life, but later correspondence with Lady Luxborough speaks of his "shattered fortune" and mentions his "loss of a place at court".

From 1753 he was a resident of Lepall House in Halesowen, where he was a neighbour of William Shenstone, through whom he became a friend of many other members of Shenstone's literary circle, including Lady Luxborough, John Pixell, Richard Graves, Richard Jago and Thomas Percy. His most famous poem was "Verses, written at the Gardens of William Shenstone, Esq., near Birmingham, 1756", which was printed in the London Magazine of September 1758.
