= Philip Southcote =

British gardener

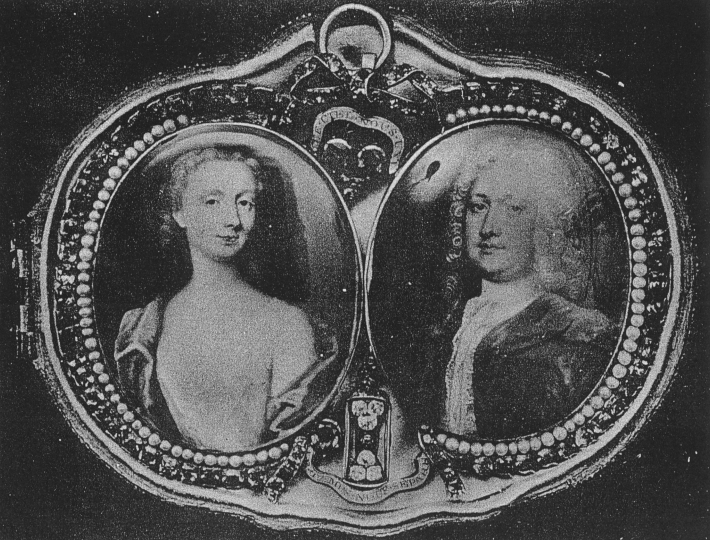
Philip Southcote and his second wife Bridget.

Capt. Philip Southcote (1698–1758) created an early example of the English landscape garden at Woburn Farm (sometimes Wooburn), near Addlestone, Surrey. It was the original ferme ornée ("decorative farm"), a term invented by Stephen Switzer in 1741

== Life ==
Philip Southcote, a young army captain, was the fourth son of Sir Edward Southcote. Southcote had a long affair with the notorious courtesan Teresia Constantia Phillips which started in 1727. Southcote bought the small property called Woburn Farm in 1735. He married the wealthy Duchess of Cleveland. They wanted a country home and Woburn Farm had 150 acres, 35 acres of which Philip used to create a beautiful garden; the rest was used as a farm. The gardens were contained within a weaving ornamental walk, remains of which can be seen between the Philip Southcote school for children with special needs and Gerry Cottle's Circus headquarters.

Woburn Farm's grotto and architectural garden follies, arches and gateways, some features designed by William Kent, including the existing rusticated entrance that marks the entrance from the public road, soon attracted stylish visitors who made the serpentine circuit of the garden, passing from feature to feature: "all my design at first was to have a garden on the middle high ground and a walk all round my farm, for convenience as well as pleasure" Southcote wrote . A feature of Woburn Farm was a walk planted with broom, roses, lilac, columbine, peonies and sweet william, which wound its way through the fields, for it remained a working farm .

Like William Shenstone's Arcadian garden, the Leasowes, Woburn Farm was highly influential in disseminating the landscape garden; it received an extended description in Thomas Whateley's Observations on modern gardening. In a letter in 1751, Horace Walpole wrote rather peevishly of Capability Brown's landscaping at Warwick Castle, "The castle is enchanting; the view pleased me more than I can express, the river Avon tumbles down a cascade at the foot of it. It is well laid out by one Brown who has set up on a few ideas of Kent and Mr. Southcote." Later in life, summing up his thoughts in his Essay On Modern Gardening, Walpole divided types of gardens in the "modern" naturalistic style into three: "into the garden that connects itself with a park, into the ornamented farm, and into the forest or savage garden". To Southcote, Walpole gives the credit for the idealized farm. .

Southcote was a friend of leading writers and gardeners of his day, including Pope, Lord Burlington, Lord Petre, and William Kent. His house is now occupied by St. George's College, and some features survive.

Subsequent owners Woburn Park owners included:

- 1783 Lord Petre
- 1816 Vice Admiral Charles Stirling, listed in deeds as Admiral Stirling but Vice-Admiral
- 1834 Lord and Lady King, later Lord (Earl of and Countess of) Lovelace
- 1862 Lord (2nd Earl of) Kilmorey

Later in life Philip married the widowed dowager the 1st Duchess of Southampton Anne Fitzroy.

== Coat of arms ==
Coat of arms of Philip Southcote (Bachelor)
Adopted 1698-1733 Crest A coot Sable Helm of an Esquire Escutcheon Argent, a chrevron gules between three coots sable, an annulet sable for difference.
