= Alexandre-Louis-Robert Girardin d'Ermenonville =

French calvalry officer (1776–1855)

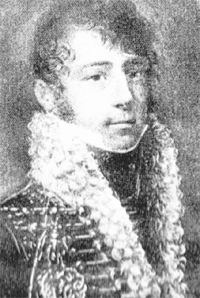
- General Alexandre de Girardin
- Born: 13 February 1776; Paris, France
- Died: 5 August 1855; Paris, France
- Relatives: René de Girardin (father); Fidèle-Henriette-Joséphine de Vintimille (wife); Émile de Girardin (son)
- Military career
- Allegiance: Kingdom of France (until 1792); French First Republic (1792–1804); First French Empire (1804–1814, 1815); Kingdom of France (Bourbon Restoration) (1814–1815, 1815–1830); Kingdom of France (July Monarchy) (1830–1848); French Second Republic (1848–1852); Second French Empire (1852–1855)
- Branch: French Navy; French Army (Cavalry)
- Rank: Général de division
- Units: 3rd Hussars; 18th Dragoons; 23rd Chasseurs à Cheval; 8th Dragoons
- Commands: Colonel of the 8th Dragoons
- Conflicts: Saint-Domingue; Austerlitz; Friedland; Sahagun; Danube campaign (1809); Russian campaign; Ostrowno; Champaubert; Campaign in Belgium (Hundred Days)
- Awards: Count of the Empire; Knight of Saint Louis; Grand Officer of the Legion of Honor; Name inscribed on the Arc de Triomphe (East pillar)

Alexandre-Louis-Robert Girardin d'Ermenonville (13 February 1776 – 5 August 1855) was a French General of Cavalry (général de cavalerie) who served as an aide-de-camp to Marshal Berthier and became a notable cavalry commander during the French Revolutionary Wars and Napoleonic Wars. In addition to his military career, he was a central organizer of the imperial and royal hunts, serving as Lieutenant de la venerie to Napoleon before continuing this role under the Grand Veneur de France to King Louis XVIII and King Charles X after the Bourbon Restoration.

== Early life and Revolutionary service ==
=== Background ===
Born in Paris on February 13, 1776, he was the son of the Marquis René-Louis de Girardin and Adelaide Cecile Berthelot De Baye. At the time of his birth, his father held the titles of Mestre de Camps des dragons (Master of Camps of the Dragoons) and Knight of the Order of St. Louis. His paternal grandfather was Louis Alexandre Gerardin de Vanoré, and his maternal grandfather was Francois Hypppolithe Berthelot, a Colonel de dragons. Girardin's father was also the friend and protector of the philosopher and writer Jean-Jacques Rousseau.

=== Education and Naval career (1787–1792) ===
Sent by the king to the school at Vannes in 1787, Girardin joined the navy in 1790 as an élève de la Marine de 3e classe. He served on the corvette La Sincère (May–September 1790), the vessel La Victoire (November–December 1790), and the vessel L'Eole (January 1791–October 1792). During this period, L'Eole was stationed in the harbor of Cap-Français (Le Cap) amid the slave insurrection, as part of the naval squadron. The squadron was commanded by Chef de Division François-Emmanuel de Girardin, a native of Martinique and possibly a relative from a colonial branch of the Girardin family, who was documented issuing orders from L'Eole. Alexandre was wounded by a ball to the leg while fighting at Saint-Domingue in 1792. On 24 October 1792, he left the service, not being included in the reorganization of the naval corps.

=== Transfer to cavalry and imprisonment ===
Upon returning to France, he joined the cavalry. He became a sous-lieutenant in the 3rd Hussars in December 1792, and transferred to the 18th Dragoons in February 1793. During the Reign of Terror, he was arrested with his brothers at their uncle's Château de Baye. He was detained in Sézanne, where his brother Stanislas recalled that he set up a carpentry workshop in the prison before eventually being released.

== Napoleonic Wars and Imperial Service ==
=== Rise through the ranks (1795–1803) ===
Girardin resumed his career on 16 July 1795 as aide-de-camp to General Pully. He served with the Army of the Rhine from 1798 to 1800, and with the Army of the Grisons from 1800 to 1801. He was promoted to lieutenant in June 1801, became an aide-de-camp to General Molitor in October 1801, and was promoted to capitaine in 1802. It was at the Girardin family home in Ermenonville in August 1800 that Napoleon first discovered shotgun hunting (chasse à tir).

=== Aide-de-Camp to Berthier and Campaign Service (1803–1811) ===
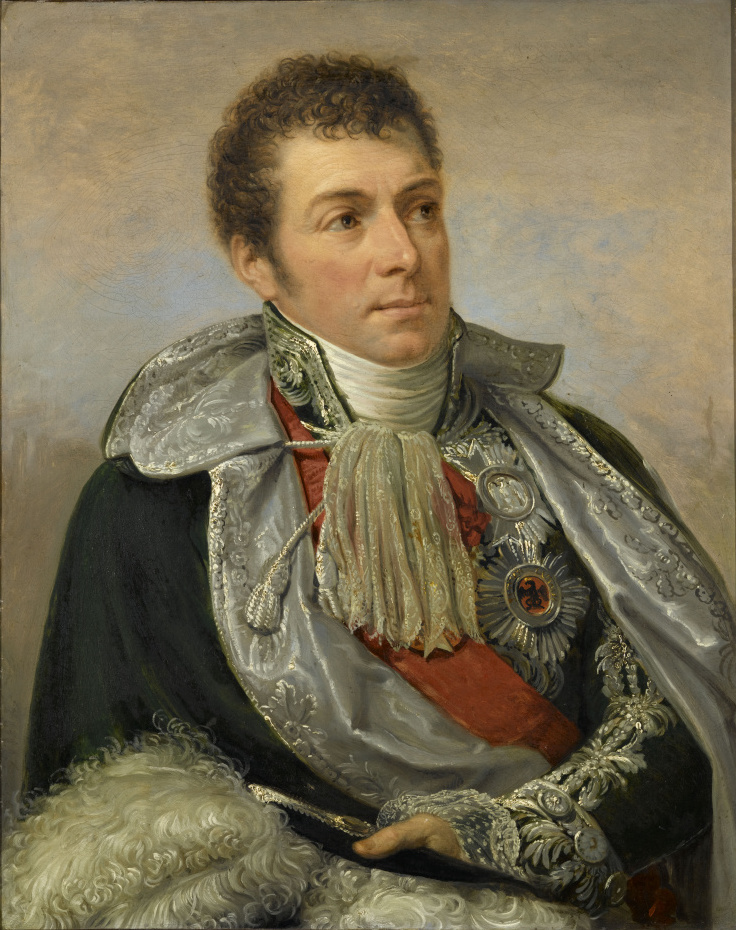
Marshal Louis-Alexandre Berthier, Girardin's commander from 1803. Portrait by Antoine-Jean Gros.

In June 1803, he became an aide-de-camp to Marshal Berthier, Minister of War. He was made a Chevalier of the Legion of Honour on 5 July 1804. In March 1805, he was assigned as a capitaine in the 23rd Chasseurs à Cheval. He served on campaign as an aide-de-camp to Marshal Berthier and fought at Austerlitz. Baron Thiébault, a fellow officer, later wrote that he witnessed Girardin display "devoted courage" during the battle. According to Thiébault, Girardin remained with the front-line infantry to help rally them during a "terrible struggle" and "gave powerful aid in supporting and cheering them on," leaving a "high opinion of him" with the combat commanders. Following his distinction at the battle, he was promoted to Officier of the Legion of Honour on 26 December 1805.

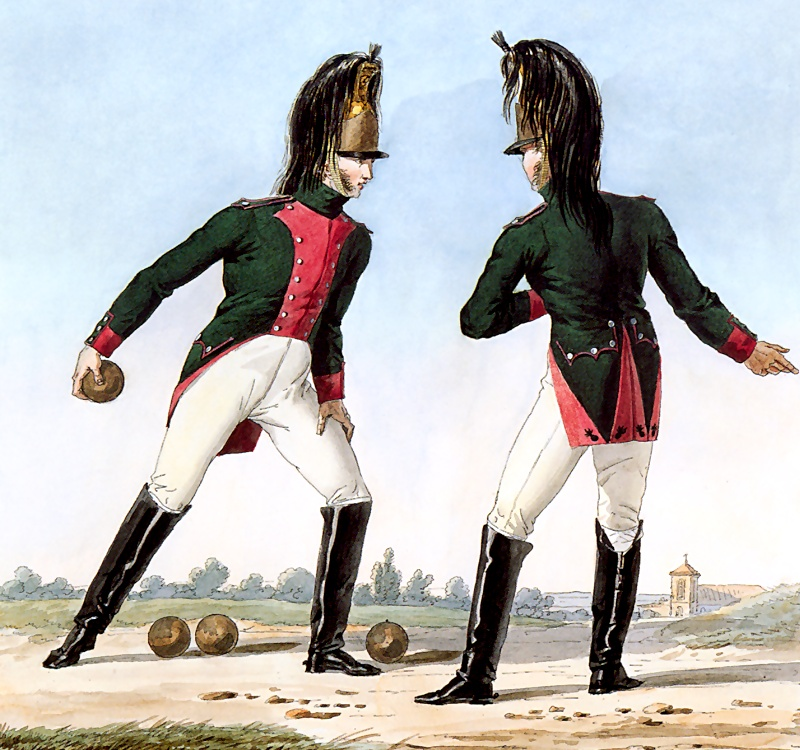
Uniform of the 8th Dragoon Regiment, which Girardin commanded from 1806 to 1811.

He was promoted to chef d'escadron in the 8th Chasseurs à Cheval in October 1805 before becoming Colonel of the 8th Dragoons on 7 December 1806. While serving in Poland, he was wounded by a saber blow near Willenberg. On 14 June 1807, the day of the Friedland, the 8th Dragoons were not at the main battle; they had been detached with Marshal Murat's cavalry reserve to march on Königsberg. It was during this separate operation that Girardin was wounded by a ball to the body.

He was named a Baron of the Empire on 1 June 1808. That same month, his brother Stanislas arrived in Bayonne on June 7, only to find that Alexandre had departed for Barèges two days earlier, a missed connection Stanislas noted with "keen sorrow." His service was highly regarded; his brother spoke to the Emperor on his behalf, noting that while Alexandre was "not yet a general," he "had the right to be one." This sentiment was reportedly shared by Marshal Berthier, the Prince of Neufchâtel, who expressed a desire to "make him a general and attach him to me as my first aide-de-camp." He served in Spain from 1808 to 1811. His regiment was part of General Debelle's cavalry brigade, which was surprised and routed by the British 15th Hussars in a sudden night attack at the Sahagun on 21 December 1808. It was near Sahagun that Girardin was wounded by a saber blow to the head. He followed Berthier to Germany in 1809 and participated in the Danube campaign. He was rewarded as a Count of the Empire in 1810, and promoted to général de brigade (Brigade General) on 22 June 1811, employed near Major General Berthier.

=== General Officer and Fall of the Empire (1812–1814) ===
On 4 January 1812, he was formally employed in the staff of the Major General (Berthier) for the Russian campaign. At the combat of Ostrowno in July 1812, he played a decisive personal role. According to the memoirs of his contemporary, General Ségur, when the French infantry line faltered, Girardin "ran to the 106th regiment, which he halted, rallied, and led back against the Russian right wing, whose position he carried, as well as two pieces of cannon and the victory." He was made a Commandeur of the Legion of Honour on 12 August 1812. In late September 1813, during the German campaign, he was entrusted as a staff officer with leading a critical column of reinforcements from the army's main depot at Mainz to the Grande Armée as it concentrated for the Battle of Leipzig.

He served in the defense of France in 1814, where his service culminated. At the Champaubert on February 10, 1814, while attached to Marshal Marmont's VI Corps, Girardin led a key cavalry charge that contributed to the rout of General Olsufiev's Russian corps. For this "brilliant conduct", he was promoted to général de division (Division General) on the same day. Marshal Marmont's memoirs place Girardin at his headquarters that same evening; Girardin, as Berthier's aide-de-camp, had arrived to deliver the official nomination promoting Marmont himself to Marshal of the Empire.

Girardin's personal bravery was again on display during the Battle of Arcis-sur-Aube on March 20. Sir Walter Scott's history of the campaign records that when Napoleon personally led a charge into the midst of broken cavalry, he was in "personal danger from the lance of a Cossack." At that moment, the thrust "was averted by his aide-de-camp, Girardin." On March 29, 1814, he was sent with orders to Marshal Marmont in Paris, but arrived just after the city's capitulation had been signed; he then brought this news back to Napoleon at Juvisy. On April 10, he was tasked with carrying Napoleon's letter regarding his abdication to Caulaincourt. During the chaotic fall of Paris that followed, Baron Thiébault recorded an incident where Girardin ordered his cuirassier division to move, but the lieutenant-colonel of the 7th Cuirassiers refused. Recognizing the breakdown of command, Girardin stated, "each man must take his own share of responsibility," and rode off with only the 4th Cuirassier regiment that had obeyed his order.

== The Hundred Days and Royal Service ==
=== First Bourbon Restoration ===
After Napoleon's abdication, Girardin was made a Knight of Saint Louis by King Louis XVIII on 8 July 1814. He was also appointed premier veneur (Master of the Hunt), a prestigious title of the Royal Household which he retained until the July Revolution of 1830.

=== Hundred Days ===
Girardin's loyalty during the Hundred Days was complex. He initially opposed Napoleon's return and was briefly tasked with commanding a cavalry division to arrest him. He did, however, eventually rally to the Emperor and was assigned as chief of staff to Marshal Grouchy's cavalry (the right wing of the army) on 13 June 1815, serving in the Belgian campaign. Subsequently, he left the army and went into hiding at Ermenonville. During this time, he corresponded with the Duc de Berry and also hid General Charles de Flahaut, one of Napoleon's former aides-de-camp, who was being sought by the royal police. This political maneuvering protected him from Bourbon reprisals after Napoleon's final defeat.

== Post-Napoleonic career and retirement ==
=== Service during the Restoration ===
Girardin was named Inspector General of Cavalry for 1816, 1817, 1819, 1821, and 1823, and was included in the general staff cadre in 1818. He also held several administrative posts, serving on the commission for revising administrative regulations (1820), presiding over a commission on pioneers and disciplinary fusiliers (1824), and sitting on the superior war council (1825) and the special committee for the cavalry (1830). For his service, he was promoted to Commander of Saint-Louis on 1 May 1821 and named Grand Officer of the Legion of Honor on 23 May 1825. Contemporaries viewed him as a calculating and effective courtier, described as "zealous, not very scrupulous, [and] quite energetic," with a "causticity and sarcasm" he used to defend himself at court.

=== July Revolution and Later Life ===
During the July Revolution of 1830, Girardin undertook a final diplomatic mission to Paris for Charles X. He was tasked with securing a 600,000 franc advance on the sale of the king's personal property, money which he successfully delivered to Charles X at Cherbourg just before his exile. Mocked by revolutionaries as "the general of the rabbits," his public life and court role as premier veneur ended with the revolution, and he was placed on availability (mis en disponibilité).

After 1830, Girardin engaged in a variety of activities. He composed satirical songs directed against King Louis Philippe I. He also entered the business world, acting as a front man (prête-nom) for the newspaper Le Garde national (1830–1832) and later as the manager for a company selling coatings called Le Sécheur in 1838. He is also noted to have worked as a tutor (rèpétiteur) and, by 1846, was in the entourage of the wife of his former commander, Marshal Berthier.

Girardin was placed on reserve status at various times (1824, 1827, 1830). He was included in the reserve cadre of the general staff in 1831 and 1839. He was admitted to retirement on 12 April 1848, but was recalled to the reserve cadre in December 1852 (effective January 1853). He died in Paris on 5 August 1855.

== Master of the Hunt ==
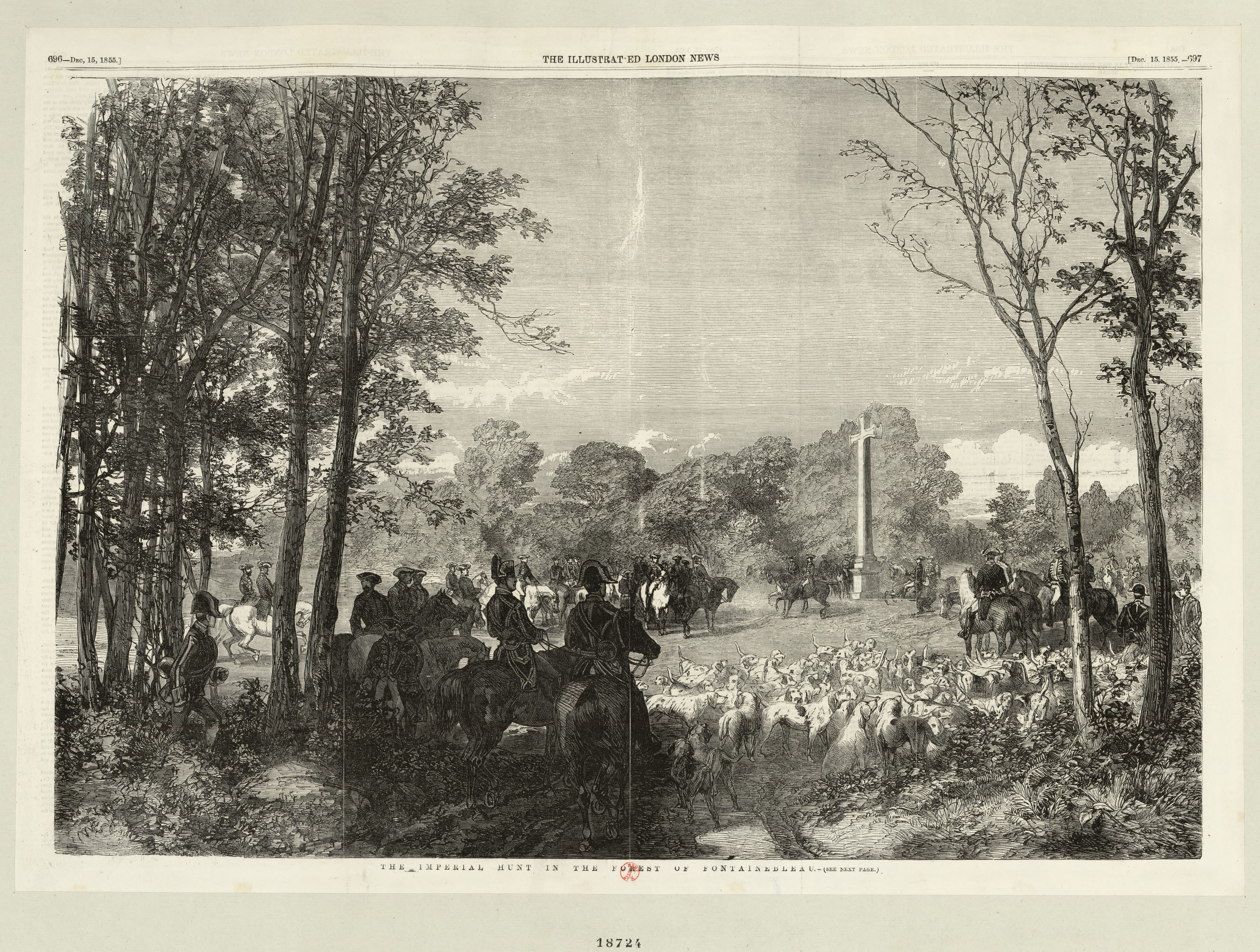
The imperial hunt in the Forest of Fontainebleau. Fontainebleau was a key hunting location for Napoleon I, Charles X, and Napoleon III

Beyond his military career, Girardin was the central organizer of the imperial and royal hunts for three successive regimes. He had experience in this role even before the empire, having organized hunts for the Director Barras at Grosbois prior to 1799. Napoleon himself first discovered shotgun hunting (chasse à tir) at the Girardin family home in Ermenonville in August 1800.

Under Napoleon, Girardin, who was also serving as an aide-de-camp to Marshal Berthier, was the main organizer of the emperor's hunts. He was named Secretaire de la venerie (Secretary of the Hunt) in June 1804 and received the prestigious title of Lieutenant de la venerie in the shooting grounds (chasses à tir) by a decree signed at Tilsit on July 7, 1807.

After the Bourbon Restoration, Girardin "continued to run the hunt," demonstrating a professional continuity that crossed political lines. His appointment as premier veneur in 1819 was a formal recognition of a political arrangement: the official Grand Veneur, the Duc de Richelieu, accepted the prestigious (and well-paid) office on the condition that he would not have to manage it. Richelieu reportedly gave his "word of honor to let Girardin do it and not to get involved in anything," which "reassured the princes" who relied on Girardin's skill.

Despite his "strong opinions and Napoleonic background," his noted efficiency and economy—and as the Comtesse de Boigne noted, his "undeniable talent for organizing hunting crews"—won him the "unshakable" favor of the dedicated royal hunters, the Comte d'Artois (later Charles X) and his sons, the Ducs d'Angoulême and de Berri, who nicknamed him "Drudin."

During the Restoration, Girardin worked to expand the hunt's power, seeking to revive ancien regime game laws. He attempted to have his role upgraded to "capitaine général des chasses," but King Louis XVIII personally refused the request and also denied him a raise. The king clarified that Girardin's "premier veneur" title was to "regularize the high administrative surveillance" only and did not give him authority over the other captains of the hunt, like the Baron d'Hanneucourt, in the field. Girardin was subsequently listed twice on the organizational chart: once as premier veneur for administration, and once as capitaine commandant for the hunt itself. This rivalry was sometimes public; on one occasion, Girardin and d'Hanneucourt had a "slight debate" over who had the right to "take the foot of the animal," a dispute which Girardin won.

In 1822, he successfully won the right for the royal hunt to award all permis de chasse (hunting permits) in state forests.

His service in this role ended with the July Revolution. On 26 July 1830, as Charles X's government collapsed, Girardin's "last act of loyalty" was to bring the king money from the hunt's reserves to help finance his journey into exile in England.

== Personal life ==
Girardin's personal life was marked by his relationships with his natural son and his wife. Prior to his marriage, he had an affair with Madame Dupuy (née Adélaïde-Marie Fagnan), which resulted in the birth of his "fils naturel" (natural son), the future journalist and politician Émile de Girardin, in 1806.

Initially, General Girardin provided for his son. In 1807, he arranged a discreet system of care by recruiting the boy's first caretaker, Louis Froidure (a former military subordinate), to be the Secretary of the Vénerie (Hunt service). This arrangement, with the hunt's office located near Marshal Berthier's residence, allowed Girardin to "keep an eye" on Émile while maintaining the discretion required at court.

This situation changed following Girardin's marriage in 1811 to Fidèle-Henriette-Joséphine de Vintimille du Luc (13 January 1789 – 29 December 1864). She was the daughter of Charles-Emmanuel de Vintimille, the recognized illegitimate son of King Louis XV. This distant, if illegitimate, royal kinship may have aided Girardin's standing with the restored Bourbon court. According to the memoirs of the Comte de Falloux, Girardin's new wife "repudiated this adoption."

Fearing that his son's existence "might be a source of annoyance to his wife," Girardin ended his direct support. This led to what Émile's biographer called a "double and complete abandonment," which was finalized in 1814. At that point, Froidure hired François Darel to take over the boy's upbringing (1814–1821). Émile was given a pension of 1,200 francs and forced to use the false name "Émile de Lamothe." Émile reportedly confronted the General, refusing the financial settlement and declaring: "Your name, or nothing!" Despite the protest, the separation was severe; Émile's biographer notes that the General "never wanted to see him again." The two met again only once, formally, in 1837, when General Girardin was required to testify to confirm Émile's French birth during a dispute over his son's election. Girardin's marriage to Fidèle de Vintimille remained childless.

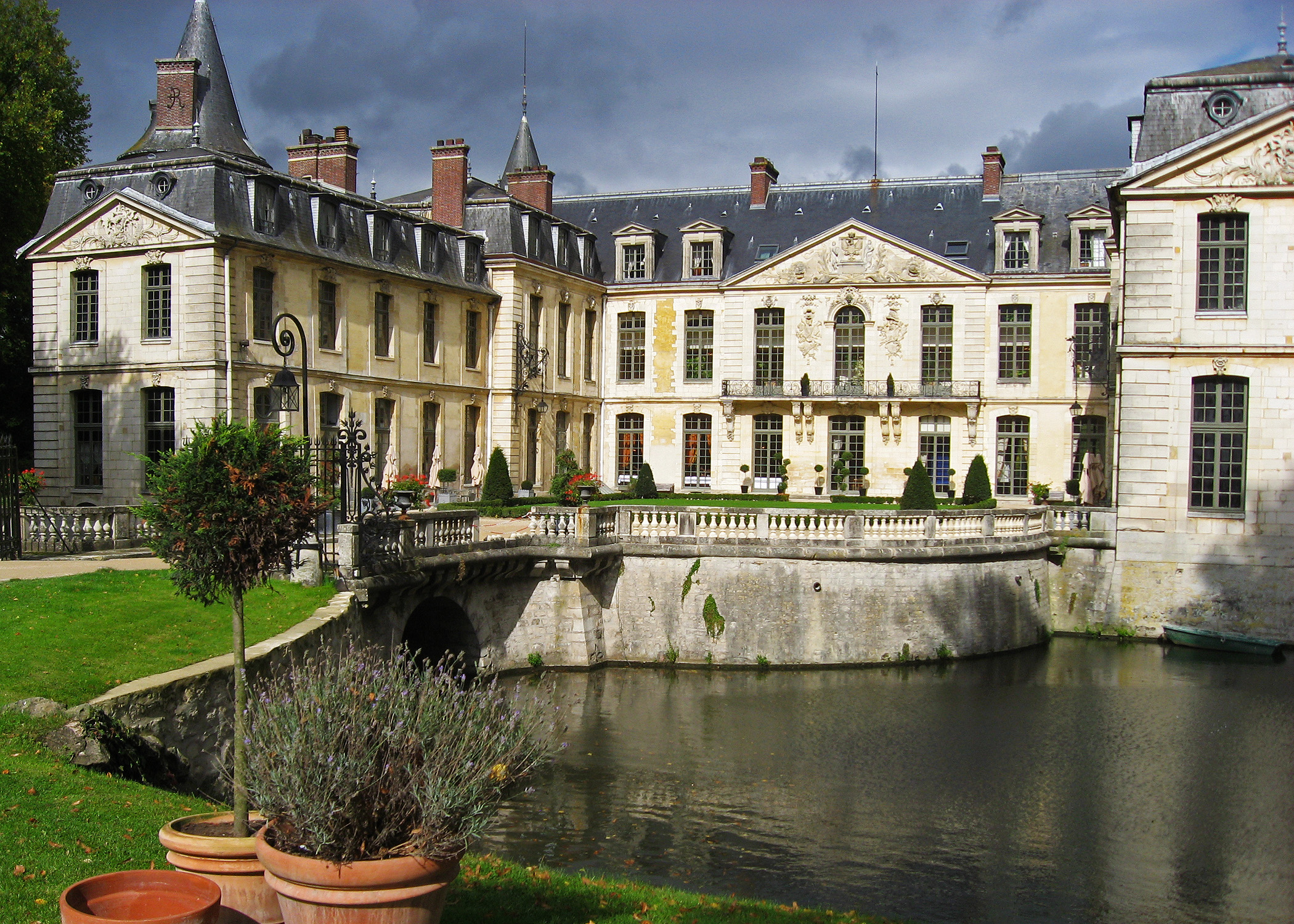
The Château d'Ermenonville, the ancestral estate co-owned by Girardin and his brothers.

Throughout his adult life, Girardin maintained a close relationship with his older brother, Stanislas de Girardin, as well as his other brothers, Amable, Louis, and Brégy. Stanislas described him in his memoirs as a "brave officer" for the army, an "aimable, spiritual (witty), and gallant man" for society, and an "excellent brother" whom he loved very much. The brothers co-owned the ancestral estate, Ermenonville, and were involved in each other's affairs; at one point, Alexandre advised Stanislas to petition the Emperor for a post as a Councilor of State. When Napoleon asked Stanislas in 1809 who owned the property, he replied, "To my brothers and to me. It is undivided."

== Legacy ==
- His name, GIRARDIN, is inscribed on the 20th column (East pillar) of the Arc de Triomphe.

== Works ==
Beyond his military and court duties, Girardin was an author on several subjects.

- Projet de législation sur les chasses (1817) - A controversial legislative proposal that, among other things, sought to restrict the right to carry arms to the wealthiest citizens and proposed a "law on the king's pleasures" that resembled a return to feudal-era hunting rights.
- Des places fortes (1837)
- Sur l'état de la population en France et sur ses conséquences (1844)
- He also authored several other works on horses.

== See also ==
- Names inscribed under the Arc de Triomphe
- French Revolutionary Wars
- Napoleonic Wars
- Nobility of the First French Empire

== Bibliography ==
- Six, Georges (1934). Dictionnaire Biographique des Généraux & Amiraux Français de la Révolution et de l'Empire (1792-1814). Vol. 1. Paris: Gaston Saffroy. p. 505.
- Odysse-Barot, François (1866). Émile de Girardin: Sa vie - ses idées - son oeuvre - son influence (in French). Paris: Michel Lévy Frères.
- Girardin, Stanislas de (1829). Mémoires, journal et souvenirs de Stanislas de Girardin (in French). Vol. 2. Paris: Chez l'éditeur.
- Oman, Charles (1902). A History of the Peninsular War, Vol. I. Oxford: Clarendon Press.
- Petre, F. Loraine (1907). Napoleon's Campaign in Poland, 1806-7. London: John Lane Company.
- Thiébault, Paul (1896). The Memoirs of Baron de Thiébault, Vol. II. London: Smith, Elder, & Co.
- Jensen, Nathan D. "General Alexandre-Louis-Robert Girardin d'Ermenonville (1776-1855)". frenchempire.net.
- Ségur, Philippe-Paul de (1825). History of the Expedition to Russia, undertaken by the Emperor Napoleon, in the year 1812. Vol. 1. London: Treuttel and Wurtz, Treuttel, jun. and Richter.
- This article incorporates text from a publication now in the public domain: Alexandre Louis Robert Girardin d'Ermenonville in Grand dictionnaire universel du XIXe siècle by Pierre Larousse.
