= Sophie Victoire Alexandrine de Girardin Vassy =

French author

- Born: c. 1762
- Died: 21 April 1845
- Notable works: Prisonnière sous la Terreur: les prisons parisiennes en 1793
- Children: 3
- Relatives: René de Girardin (father)

Sophie Victoire Alexandrine de Girardin (c. 1762 – 21 April 1845) was a French aristocrat. She is known for her book about women's life in prison during the French Revolution.

== Biography ==
Sophie Victoire Alexandrine de Girardin was the second child of René de Girardin and Cécile Brigitte Adélaïde Berthelot.

She married Alexandre de Vassy, the marquess of Pirou in 1781 and the couple had a son, Amédée. Widowed a few years later, she married Chrétien André Guillaume de Bohm (1768–1824) in 1803. They had a daughter and a son.

During the French Revolution, Sophie went to Switzerland to escape persecution. She spent four years there then returned to France and was arrested in Senlis on August 15, 1793. She was imprisoned in Chantilly prison and somewhere between the end of the year 1793 and the beginning of 1794, she was transferred to the Plessis prison, which was known to be a terrible one.

She was released on August 31, 1794, after Robespierre's death. In 1830, she published what is one of the most precise book about women's living conditions in prison during the French Revolution: Prisonnière sous la Terreur: mémoires d'une captive en 1793 [earlier title: Les Prisons en 1793].

She died on April 21, 1845, and is buried next to her husband Chrétien de Bohm in the Père Lachaise Cemetery in Paris.

== Bibliography ==
- Bohm, Sophie de (2006) [1830]. Prisonnière sous la Terreur: les prisons parisiennes en 1793 [Prisoner during the Terror: Parisian prisons in 1793]. Paris: Cosmopole éditions. ISBN 9782846300278. OCLC 70712433.
