= Henrietta Knight =

Henrietta Knight may refer to:

- Henrietta Knight (racehorse trainer) (born 1946), English racehorse trainer
- Henrietta Knight, Lady Luxborough (1699–1756), British poet
