= Richard Jago =

English clergyman, poet and minor landscape gardener

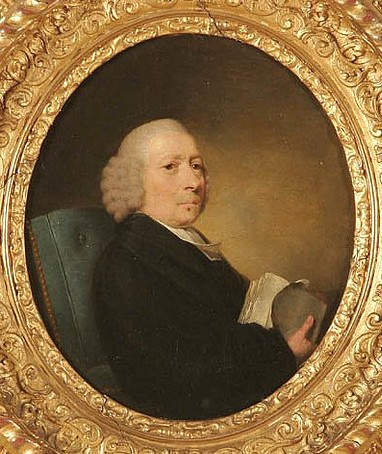
A contemporary portrait of Richard Jago

Richard Jago (1 October 1715 – 8 May 1781) was an English clergyman poet and minor landscape gardener from Warwickshire. Although his writing was not highly regarded by contemporaries, some of it was sufficiently novel to have several imitators.

== Life ==
Richard Jago was the third son of the Rector of Beaudesert, Warwickshire, and was named after him. His father's family was of Cornish origin, while his mother was from the immediately adjoining village of Henley in Arden. He was educated at Solihull School, where one of its five houses is now named after him. While there he formed a lifelong friendship with William Shenstone.

In 1732, he went up to University College, Oxford and while there Shenstone made him acquainted with other students with a literary taste. He took his master's degree 9 July 1738, having entered into the church the year before, and served the curacy of Snitterfield, Warwickshire, near Stratford upon Avon. In 1744, he married Dorothea Susanna Fancourt, daughter of the rector of Kimcote in Leicestershire, whom he had known from her childhood. In 1751 his wife died, leaving him with the care of seven very young children. Three of these were boys, who predeceased him, but he was eventually survived by three of his daughters. In 1759, he married a second wife, Margaret Underwood, but had no children by her.

Jago had become vicar of Harbury in 1746, and shortly after of Chesterton, both in Warwickshire. Through aristocratic patrons, he was given the living of Snitterfield in 1754, and later was presented with his former father-in-law's living in Kimcote in 1771, after which he resigned the livings of Harbury and Chesterton, keeping the others. Snitterfield remained his favourite residence and it was there that he would die at the age of 66.

Jago shared with Shenstone an interest in landscape gardening and occupied himself with making improvements to the Snitterfield vicarage garden. Both became part of the likeminded circle about Henrietta Knight, Lady Luxborough which also included other literary friends, William Somervile and Richard Graves, rector of Claverton. Shenstone dedicated a bench to Jago at the end of the viewing circuit near his house, The Leasowes, and both dedicated poems to each other.

== Poetry ==
Jago's first independent publications were two sermons. The first, "The Cause of Impenitence Considered" (1755), was published for the benefit of Harbury Free School; the second was a funeral sermon, "The nature and grounds of a Christian's happiness in and after death" (1763). Shenstone's letters mention an Essay on Electricity by Jago, written in 1747, but this seems to have remained unpublished.

Poems of his were also beginning to appear in Robert Dodsley's anthologies, Collection of Poetry by several hands, among which the sentimental elegy "The Blackbirds" had made something of a stir after it first appeared in the ephemeral magazine The Adventurer in 1753. This was a lament on the death of a self-sacrificing blackbird and was shortly followed by similar poems on goldfinches and swallows. They were particularly praised by Dr. John Aikin in his "Essay on the application of Natural History to poetry", who also noted that there were soon imitations among other minor poets, including Samuel Jackson Pratt's "The Partridges, an elegy" (1771) and James Graeme's "The Linnet" (1773).

Jago's most ambitious publication was the four-part topographical poem, Edge Hill, or the rural prospect delineated and moralised (1767). It was written in blank verse and was once described as "the most elaborate local poem in our language". The poet takes his stance on the hill in the morning, facing south-west (book 1); at noon he is on Ratley Hill in the centre (books 2–3) and then moves along the ridge to look north-east at evening. The poem intermingles description with legendary, historical and antiquarian particulars, principally the battle at the start of the English Civil War. Imaginary excursions are made to Warwick, Coventry, Kenilworth, Solihull, and industrial Birmingham (under the name Bremicham), as well as many "flattering descriptions of all the great houses and seats of important people which come within his survey". Local rivers are also included and even the nearby canal on which "sooty barks pursue their liquid track". There are many digressions as well, including descriptions of industrial processes and of the nature of vision and the working of the telescope.

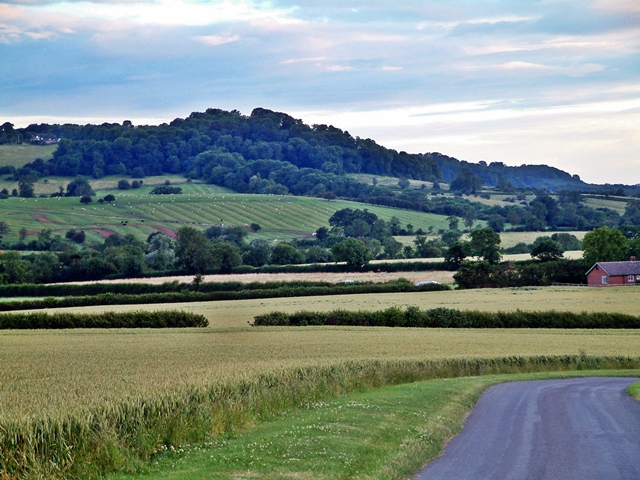
Edge Hill, showing distinctive mediaeval ridge and furrow systems

The critic already quoted finds the poem "really interesting; with the scene before us, it is impossible not to admire the ingenuity and scrupulous thoroughness with which the author has performed his task," although ultimately it is lacking in poetic execution. The Cambridge History of English and American Literature judges that "his catalogues have little picturesqueness or colour; while his verse, although it is not without the accent of local association, is typical, as a whole, of the decadence of the Miltonic method of natural description in the 18th century. Every group of trees is a grove, every country house a dome, and every hill a precipice". Particular examples of hackneyed diction include Latin-derived adjectives, as in "Honington's irriguous meads", or else 18th century circumlocutions such as "the woolly tribes" when sheep are meant. Nevertheless, the poem seems to have inspired the writing of the much shorter and simpler "Ode to Lansdowne Hill" (1785), which celebrates the site of another Civil War battle.

In the following year Jago published "Labour and Genius, or the mill-stream and the cascade", a humorous fable in octosyllabic verse written in memory of William Shenstone and his landscaped grounds at the Leasowes. Poems of lesser significance appeared here and there and Jago was working on a revised edition of his collected poems just before his death. This appeared posthumously as Poems, Moral and Descriptive in 1784. Included there was another homage to Milton in the oratorio "Adam, or the fatal disobedience, compiled from Milton's Paradise Lost and adapted to music". The rhymed choruses there were of Jago's composition, but the main body of the work is adapted directly from Paradise Lost. Though it found no composer to set it, another of Jago's pieces did. This was the "Roundelay for the Stratford Jubilee" organised by David Garrick in 1769, which was set for singing by Charles Dibdin.

One other humorous piece also found an imitator. In Jago's "Hamlet's soliloquy imitated", a minor poet agonises over whether "to print or not to print" and run the danger, by submitting his verses to Dodsley, to "lose the name of author". A subsequent parody titled "The Presbyterian parson's soliloquy" over the question to "conform or not conform" appeared in The Hibernian Magazine in 1774 and was often reprinted thereafter, ascribed to Samuel Badcock. One later commentator gave it as his opinion that "the hint of this parody was probably borrowed from Mr Jago's". Slight Jago's output may have been, but it appears to have been influential in its time.

== Bibliography ==
- ROBERT ANDERSON, "THE LIFE OF JAGO" in WORKS OF THE BRITISH POETS (1795) 11:675-78
- The Poems of Gray and Jago, Chiswick 1822 pp.119–264
- Cary, Henry Francis, Lives of English poets, from Johnson to Kirke White, designed as a continuation of Johnson's lives, London 1846, Vol.55, pp.103–7
- Some biographical notes are to be found in the letters of William Shenstone to Jago printed in vol. iii. of Shenstone's Works (1769).
