= Edward Alcock (artist) =

English painter

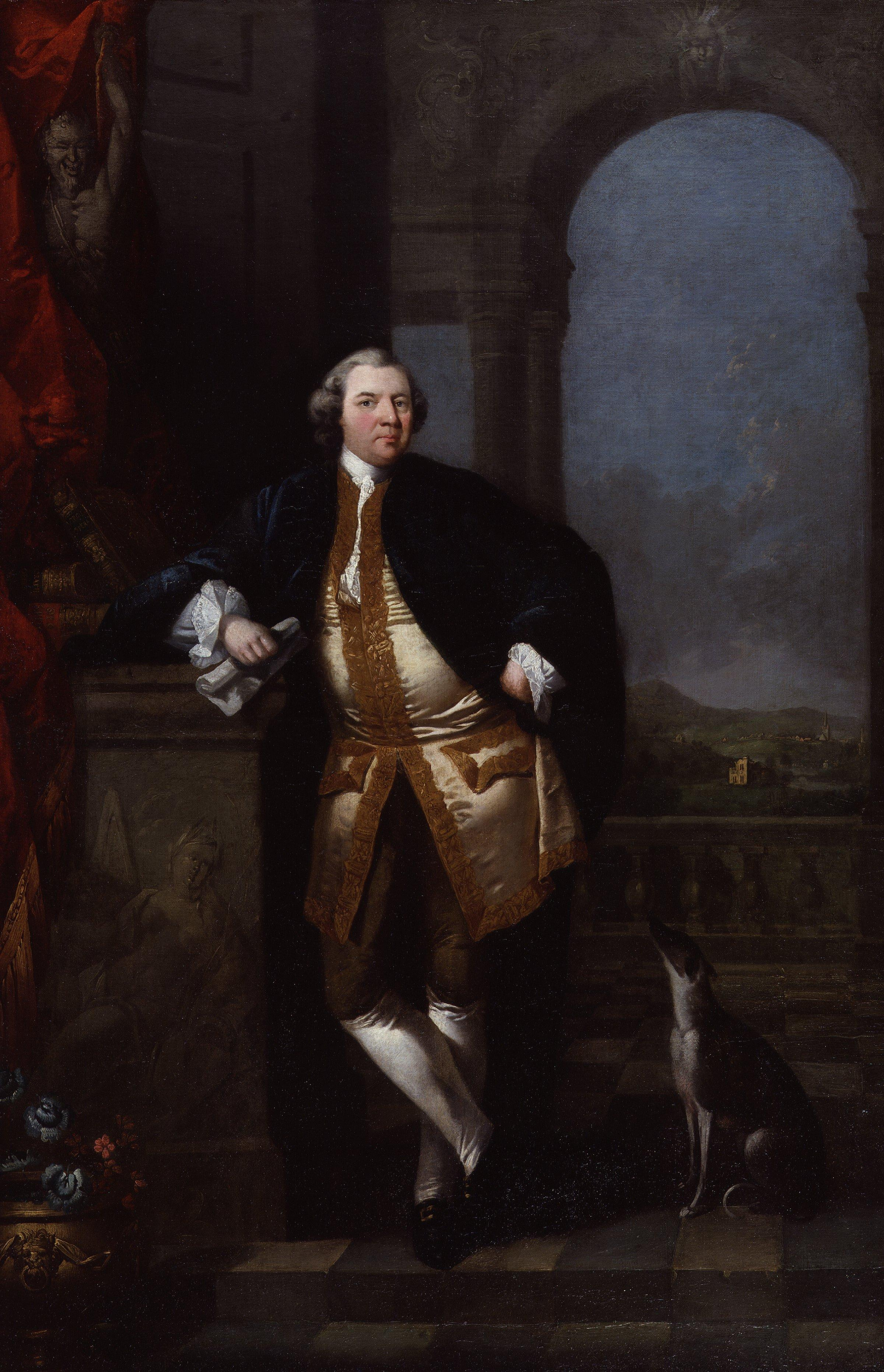
Edward Alcock, William Shenstone (1760), oil on canvas

Edward Alcock (fl. 1745–1778) was an English painter of portraits and miniatures.

Alcock lived in a variety of towns around England and was described by the poet William Shenstone as "the most volatile of all creatures that have not wings". He is first recorded living with his mother in 1745 in Liverpool, where he went into partnership with a carver-and-gilder in 1747. He was recorded in Bath in 1757 and was living in Birmingham between 1759 and 1760, where he painted a full-length portrait of Shenstone now in the National Portrait Gallery. He was described as "Mr Alcock of Bristol" in 1769 by Thomas Chatterton writing under the pseudonym Asaphides in his poem dedicated to the miniature painter beginning, "Ye nine awake the corded shell, Whilst I the praise of Alcock tell" and by 1778 was living in London and exhibiting at the Royal Academy and Free Society of Artists, while retaining strong links with Birmingham.
