= René de Girardin =

French landscape gardener

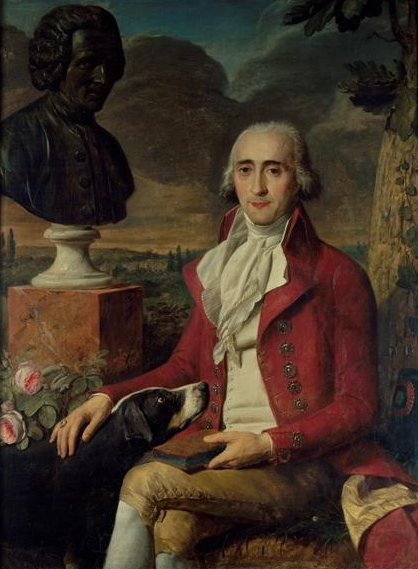
- Born: 25 February 1735
- Died: 1808 (aged 72 or 73)
- Known for: Landscape gardening

René Louis de Girardin (French pronunciation: [ʁəne lwi də ʒiʁaʁdɛ̃]; 25 February 1735 – 1808), Marquis of Vauvray, was Jean-Jacques Rousseau's last pupil. He created the Parc Jean-Jacques Rousseau at Ermenonville, the first French landscape garden. It was inspired by Rousseau's ideas. De Girardin was the author of De la composition des paysages (1777), which strongly influenced the style of the modern French landscape garden.

== Biography ==
Girardin was descended from the old Florentine Gherardini family. In 1762 he inherited his title of Marquis of Vauvray and his mother's fortune (she was the daughter of René Hatte, the chief tax collector for Louis XV). The inheritance included 300,000 livres and the 800-hectare (2,000-acre) estate of Ermenonville. His estates brought him an income of about 100,000 livres a year.

Girardin became an officer in Louis XV's army and served until the end of the Seven Years' War. He then left the army and went to Lunéville, where he joined the Polish Court of King Stanisław Leszczyński.

In 1761, he married Cécile Brigitte Adélaide Berthelot, daughter of the maréchal des camps et armées of Lorraine. They had four sons and two daughters. Their eldest son, Cécile Stanislas-Xavier (born 1762), was the godson of King Stanislas and became an important political figure during the French Revolution and a member of the French National Assembly from 1791 to 1792. Girardin left the Polish court after the king's theater presented a play ridiculing Rousseau's ideas. One of their daughters was the author Sophie Victoire Alexandrine de Girardin Vassy (born 1762). Their son Alexandre-Louis-Robert Girardin d'Ermenonville became a general during the First French Empire.

He traveled for three years, visiting Italy, Switzerland, Germany and England; in England he visited Stowe, which he did not much admire because he felt it contrary to nature in its collection of different styles. He did, however, greatly admire the English poet William Shenstone's garden at The Leasowes.

== Garden at Ermenonville ==
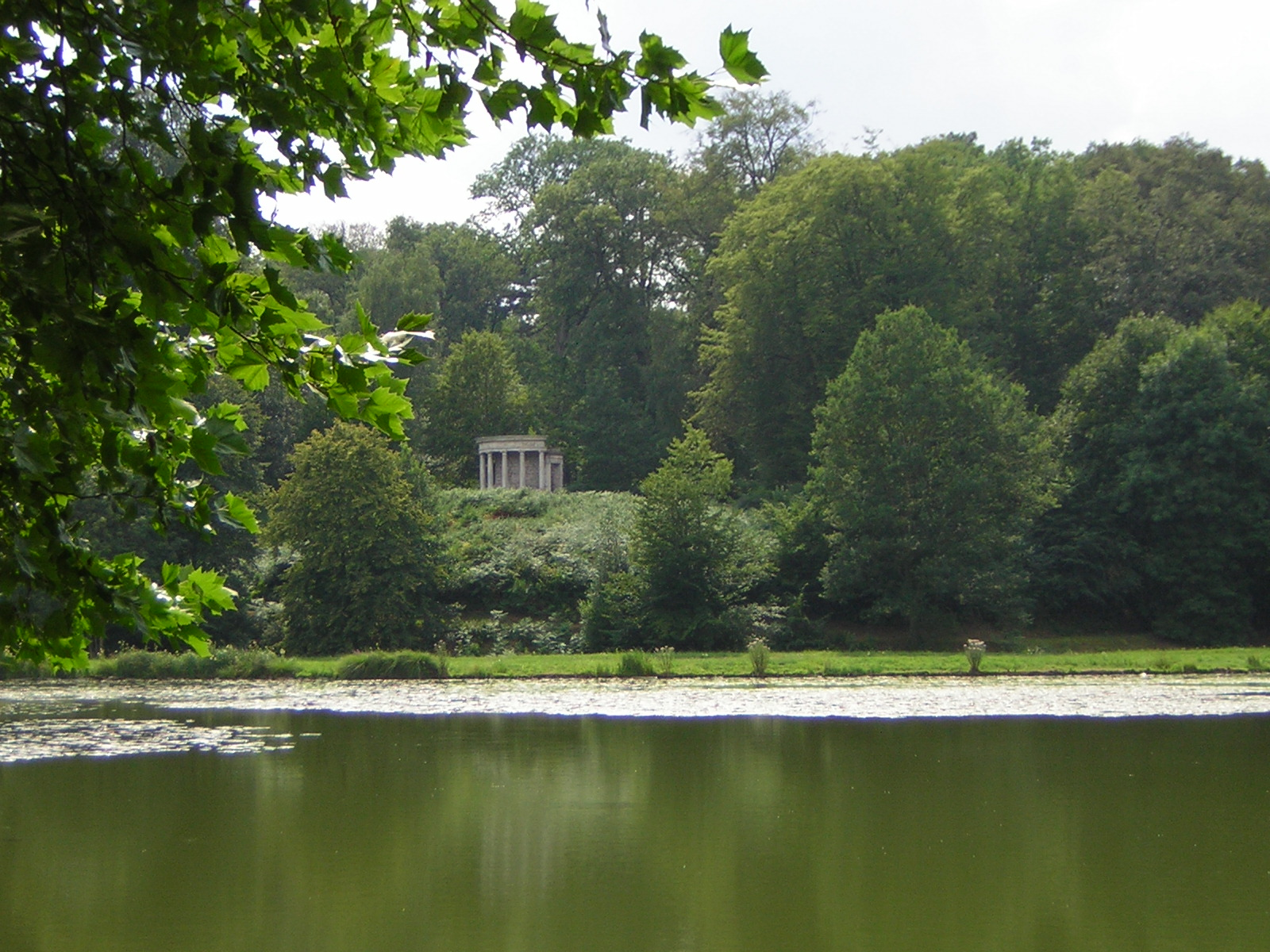
His garden at Ermenonville, created 1764 – 1776

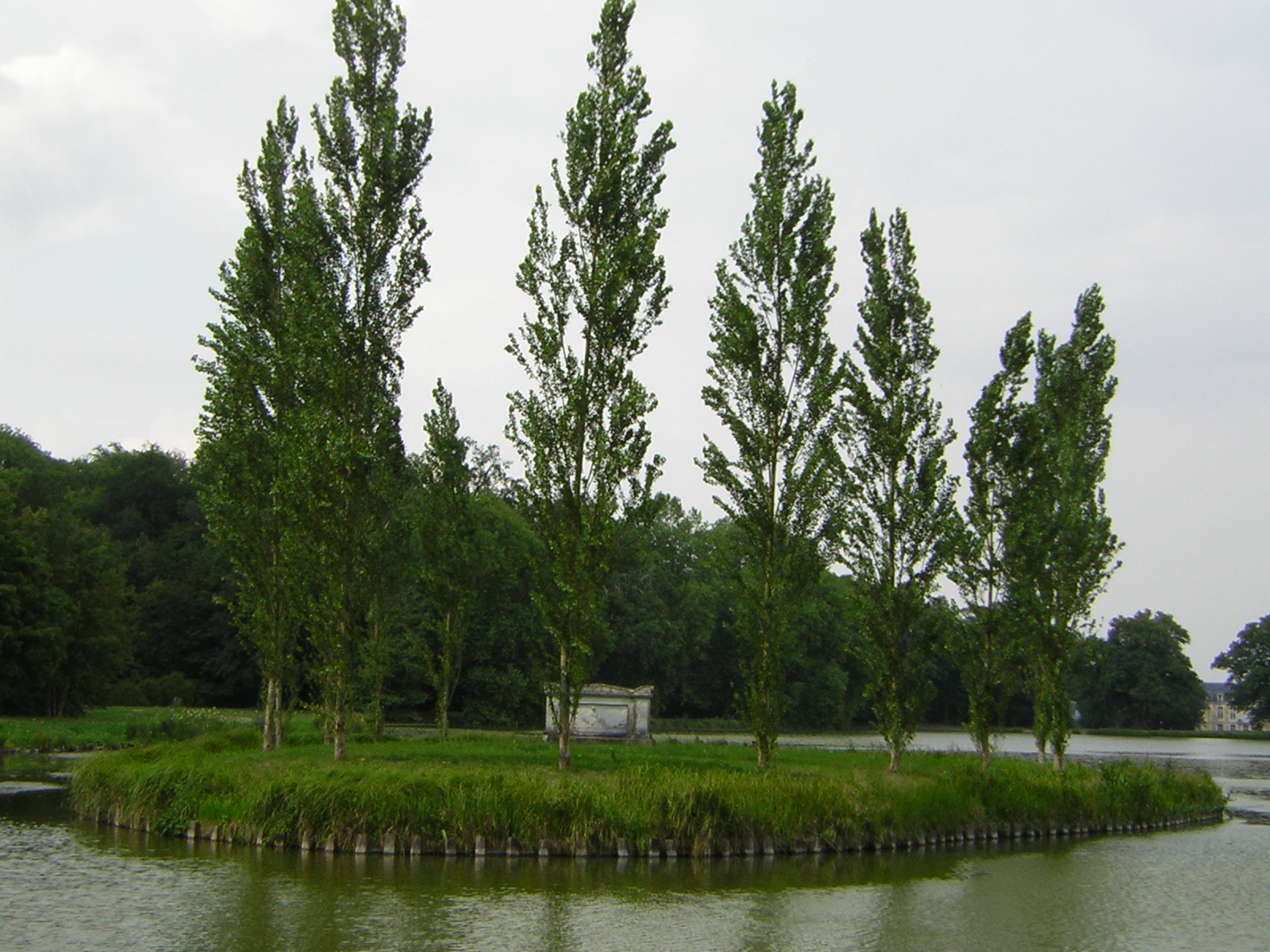
Jean Jacques Rousseau's grave at Ermenonville

In 1762 he settled at Ermenonville and began to design a new garden to illustrate his philosophical and social ideas about the place of man in nature. The garden was laid out along a small river, the Aunette, where a series of ponds had been overgrown by nature. It was composed to show idealized nature, decorated with symbolic pieces of architecture, such as the Temple of Philosophy. It was left unfinished to show that the search for knowledge is never complete.

He brought one hundred workers from England and a Scottish gardener to help him with the work, and he himself made many drawings of the effects that he wanted. Hubert Robert also came to Ermenonville and helped. Robert is described as the architect of Rousseau's cenotaph and possibly also of the Temple of Philosophy. The garden was largely laid out by 1776.

== Rousseau ==
Girardin had long admired the works of Jean-Jacques Rousseau. He raised his children according to Rousseau's principles, in l'Émile. He visited Rousseau in Paris with his son, who played Rousseau's compositions on the spinet while Rousseau sang.

In the wildest part of the park, called Le Desert, (Note: A desert in the French Encyclopedia of the time referred to "a place propitious for cultivating dreams and nostalgia") Girardin started to build a house for Rousseau, modeled after the "Élysée" of Julie in Rousseau's novel La Nouvelle Héloïse. Rousseau visited the garden in May 1778 and was enchanted by the setting. He stayed in a small cottage with a thatched roof surrounded by rocks, a setting created by Girardin from Rousseau's novel. Rousseau stayed at the cottage until his death in July 1778.

Girardin made a tomb for Rousseau designed by Hubert Robert and sculpted by Jacques-Philippe Le Sueur. The tomb and the garden became a destination of pilgrimage for admirers of Rousseau, including Joseph II, Holy Roman Emperor, King Gustav III of Sweden, the future Czar Paul I of Russia, Benjamin Franklin, Thomas Jefferson, Georges Danton, Maximilien Robespierre, François-René de Chateaubriand, Queen Marie Antoinette, and Napoleon. On 11 October 1794, his body was removed and reinterred in the Pantheon in Paris near the remains of Voltaire.

When Rousseau died, he left behind at Ermenonville the manuscripts of his most important works, including Les Confessions and Les Rêveries du promeneur solitaire. Girardin and two other friends of Rousseau prepared a complete edition of his works, which was published in Geneva between 1780 and 1782. The new edition contributed greatly to spreading Rousseau's ideas throughout France in the years leading up to the French Revolution.

== French Revolution ==
Girardin had radical political ideas. Between 1777 and 1780 he brought a lawsuit against Berthier, the last chancellor of the King's exchequer. He called the Royal tax collectors "the oppressors of the peasants and creators of the gangrene of the country." As a protest, in 1787 he blocked the entrance to his park from noble hunters, who claimed the right to hunt anywhere, and put a large sign on a hut by the entrance proclaiming "The carpenter is master of his own house". For this he was called before the Council of Marshals of France and reprimanded, and left to England and Belgium to avoid being arrested.

Girardin returned to France after the Revolution in 1789. He entered politics advocating Rousseau's ideas and wanted a representative assembly. He became a member of the party of Jacobins in 1790.

The next year he published a pamphlet proposing the abolition of the Royal Army, and its replacement by a citizen's militia. And another pamphlet calling for all laws to be approved by the public. He was disillusioned by the massacre on the Champ de Mars in Paris on July 17, 1791; he left politics and moved to his estate at Ermenonville.

In 1792 Girardin and his wife were put under house arrest, and their children imprisoned, until September 1794. Their chateau and gardens were pillaged, and Rousseau's ashes were moved from the garden of Ermenonville to the Panthéon, Paris. Girardin, disillusioned by the behavior of the villagers of Ermenonville, retired to a house at Vernouillet, where he republished as De la composition des paysages in 1805, and created a small garden. He died in 1808.

== Landscape gardening ==
Girardin's textbook on gardening, De la composition des paysages sur le terrain ou des moyens d'embellir la nature près des habitations en y joignant l'agréable à l'utile ("On the creation of landscapes, or means of embellishing nature near inhabited places in merging the agreeable and the useful") was published in 1777 and republished in 1805, under the name René Louis Gerardin. Toward the end of the book he explained his view of the purpose of gardens:

Of the power of landscapes over our senses, and as a result upon our soul.

"The composition of landscapes," he wrote, "can open the way to the renewal of the moral principles of the nation." He wrote in the last chapter, "...If you want to achieve true happiness, you must always seek the simplest means and the arrangements closest to those of nature, because only those are true and will have a long-lasting effect."

Girardin said that gardens should be composed of a series of scenes, like paintings. Each designed to be seen from a different point of view and at different times of day to achieve an emotional effect. Some scenes should evoke solitude, others the pleasures of bucolic life, others the ideals of harmony and innocence. These scenes would be discovered by following a winding path through the garden, with a series of different views coming as surprises. He combined his ideas of creating gardens with those of a new rural social organization, where peasants own their own land.

== See also ==
- Émile de Girardin
- Parc Jean-Jacques Rousseau
- Lion Feuchtwanger
