= Larchill =

Ferme ornee garden in County Kildare, Ireland

Coordinates: 53.4387°N 6.6564°W

Larchill is a ferme ornée (ornamental farm-style garden), and the site of multiple follies, in the townland of Phepotstown near Kilcock, County Meath, Ireland. According to its owners, it is the "only surviving, near complete, garden of its type in Europe". The main component of Larchill Demesne, that was created in the mid-18th century, and restored in the mid-1990s.

== History ==
The site was originally the home farm of the Phepotstown House estate, and the ferme ornee was started by Robert Prentice, a Quaker businessman who leased the estate in 1708. Following financial difficulties the Larchill property was separated from Phepotstown around 1780. Development continued under the Watson family, notably Robert Watson and his wife, who leased Larchill from 1790. While work continued into the early 19th century, the ornamental features later fell into neglect.

A family bought Larchill in 1994 and named it de Las Casas. By then, many of the follies were semi-derelict, the lake had been drained and the walled garden was being used for grazing. They secured a grant for restoration from the "Great Gardens of Ireland Programme" and, helped by a FAS Community Employment Scheme, the restoration project was carried out between 1994 and 1999, winning a number of awards.

== Features ==
=== Layout ===
The farm and garden form a rough rectangle, with scenic parkland walks, including beech avenues, linking key features. The walled garden and farmyard are situated at the north end, and a substantial lake at the south end.

=== Walled garden and farmyard ===
Restored to a traditional 18th century formal design in the 1990s and influenced by Gertrude Jekyll, the walled garden has multiple beds, including herb and vegetable sections, borders of perennial planting, box hedges, and water features.

A feature of the walled garden is the 'Cockle Tower', a circular castellated construction on three-levels in the south west corner. Commenced in 1740, it has rough limestone rubble walls, and an entrance on the first level above ground, reached by steps. Both doorway and windows have pointed arches. The interior was decorated with shells, of which some remain.

Also attached to the walls is an ornamental dairy, on the southern elevation. Begun around 1740, it has an arcade, with columns, arched openings and stained glass windows, and a shell fountain.

The Gothic-style farmyard, in the form of two courtyards to north of the main house, has dovecotes, stable ranges and pigsties. The buildings have "Hit and Miss" slate roofs, limestone dressings, and timed-framed and diamond-paned windows.

=== Lake ===
The ornamental lake has an area of around 8-acre (32,000 m^{2}), with two islands, each featuring a folly, and a statue of Bacchus between them. There is also an ornamental Gothic boathouse dug into the side of the lake, with a single-arch to the lake, and a wrought-iron gate to the rear. By the lake are water and flower meadows. Fauna include frogs, dragonflies, wild duck and swans.

There is a Chinese prayer lantern to the south of the lake, with a Chinoiserie bridge, in place of what used to be a bridge to the Temple Island.

=== Follies ===
- The Fox's Earth, an ornamented mausoleum mound, built by Robert Watson because he believed he would be punished for excessive fox-hunting by being reincarnated as a fox, and would need a refuge. The "Earth" is a three-bay one-story façade set on an artificial hillock, with a small 6-pillar rustic temple on top. Pointed arch openings to three-bay façade. A rubble stone bridge leads to the site.
- Rustic Temple (woodland), commenced 1740, with six rendered columns in a hexagonal plan, stone seats, and a rubble stone dome. The temple is flanked by rendered walls with circular terminating piers.
- Temple Island with Lake Temple, whose roof sloped inwards to gather rainwater in a plunge pool
- "Gibraltar" is a miniature triangular fortress, based on The Prentice family memories of the Rock of Gibraltar, started around 1740. It has corner towers and turrets, rendered walls with castellations, and openings with pointed arches and gun loops.

Mock naval battles were fought on the lake in past centuries.

=== Other features ===
There is an 18th-century "sheep run" and at the north end of the western walk are a 19th-century Chinese prayer lamp and statue. There is also an eel pond, and an "eel house", a tower in which to catch eels.

When the lake was dug in the 18th century, the soil from the excavation was used to form a "feuillé", a circular mound with a decorative spiral of beech trees on top.

== Farm animals ==
Rare breeds of animal were used in the 18th and 19th century in ferme ornee-style gardens, and emus, graze the parkland. .

== Facilities ==
There is parking for cars and coaches and a picnic area. The gardens open May to June, and for a few days in August, and an admission fee is charged. Weekend events happen regularly The former general tea room in a converted barn, operates only for groups.
