= Ferme ornée =

Garden history term for ornamental farm

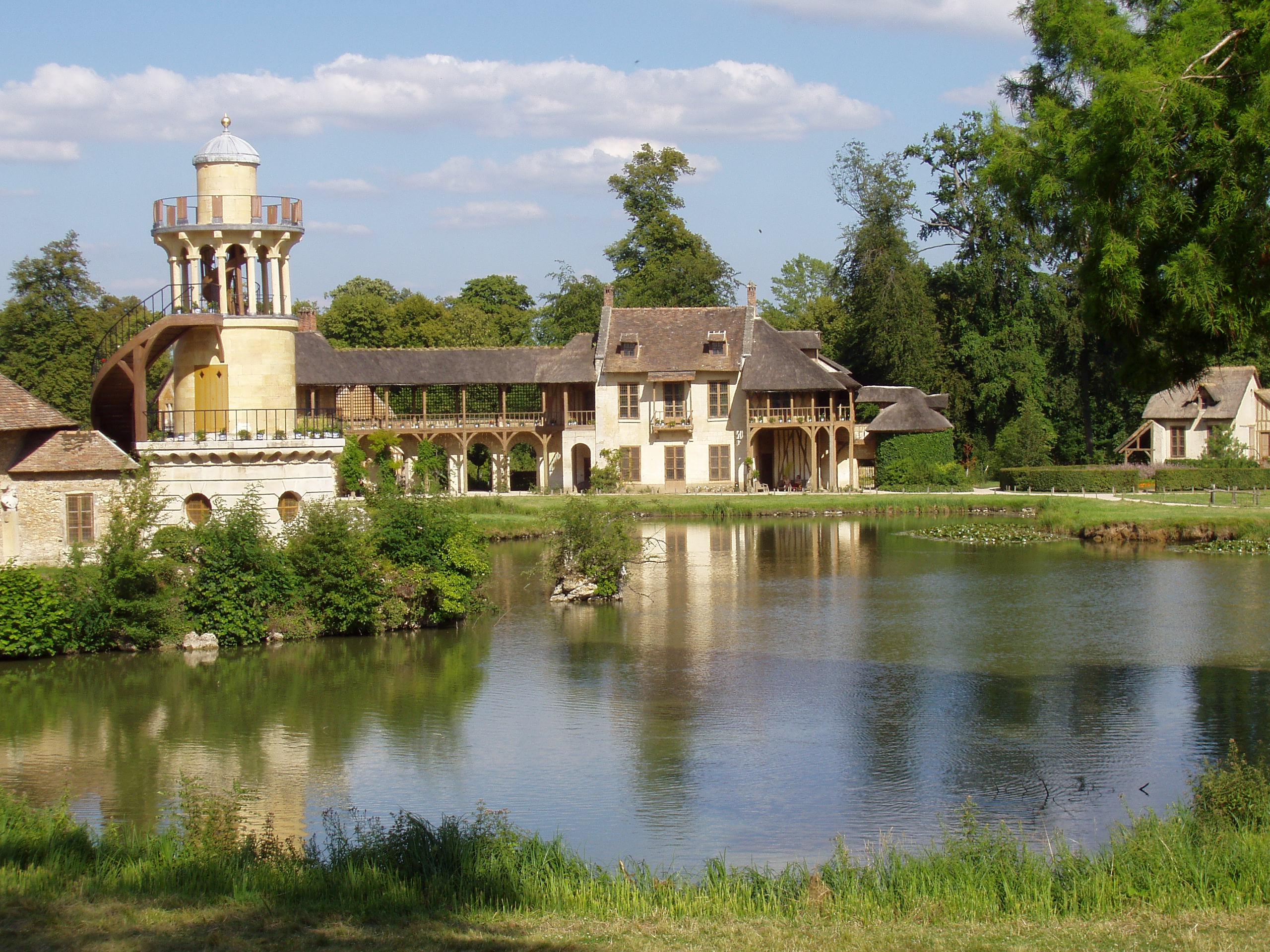
Marie Antoinette's Hameau de la Reine

The term ferme ornée as used in English garden history derives from Stephen Switzer's term for 'ornamental farm'. It describes a country estate laid out partly according to aesthetic principles and partly for farming. During the eighteenth century the original ferme ornée was Woburn Farm, made by Philip Southcote, who bought the property in 1734. William Shenstone's garden at The Leasowes was also a ferme ornée. Marie Antoinette made a later example at Versailles in the form of the Hameau de la Reine, created between 1783 and 1787, but it was much more for pleasure than for food production. The Dessau-Wörlitz Garden Realm was said to be the largest ferme ornée in 18th-century Europe. The most complete surviving example is said to be Larchill near Kilcock, Ireland.

Stephen Switzer, in The Nobleman, Gentleman and Gardener's Recreation (1715), describes the practice of the ferme ornée "By mixing the useful and profitable parts of Gard'ning with the Pleasurable in the Interior Parts of my Designs and Paddocks, obscure enclosures, etc. in the outward, My Designs are thereby vastly enlarg'd and both Profit and Pleasure may be agreeably mix'd together". His English readers would detect, in the juxtaposition of useful and pleasurable, the classical view of the twin aims of poetry, inherited from Horace, "to instruct and to delight".

== Cultural background and spirituality ==
The 'Ferme Ornée' gardens of the 18th century were an expression in landscape gardening of the Romantic movement. Emulating Arcadia, a pastoral paradise was created to reflect Man's harmony with the perfection of nature. A working farm, domestic animals and the natural landscape were ornamented by allusions to Arcadia: follies and grottoes, statuary and classical texts were combined with serpentine avenued walks, flowing water and lakes, areas of light and shade, special planting and inspirational framed views. Freed from the restrictions of the 17th century formal garden, the 'Ferme Ornée' was the first move towards the Brownian landscape parkland.

The functioning aspect of the ferme ornée was not easily kept from being sidelined by its picturesque aspects, as happened at Marie Antoinette's artificial "Hameau" at Versailles, where no commercial farming was carried on.

Annick Lodge Estate, built by Captain Montgomerie, the brother of the Earl of Eglinton, was described by John Stoddart in 1800 as "a complete specimen of the English Ferme Ornee." In the nearby Eglinton Estate, Ayrshire is also an example of the principles of Ferme Ornee: "Near to the gardens, in a remote corner, more than half encircled by the river, a remarkably handsome cottage has been reared, and furnished, under the direction of Lady Jean Montgomery (Countess of Eglinton), who has contrived to unite neatness and simplicity, with great taste, in the construction of this enchanting hut. That amiable lady, spends occasionally, some part of her leisure hours, about this delightful cottage: viewing the beauties, and contemplating the operations of nature, in the foliage of leaves, blowing of flowers, and maturation of fruits; with other rational entertainments, which her enlightened mind is capable of enjoying."

== Period examples of the ferme ornée ==
- Woburn Farm, Surrey, created by Philip Southcote (died 1758).
- Farnborough Hall, Warwickshire. Dairy ground created by Henry Hakewill.
- The Leasowes, Shropshire, created by the poet William Shenstone (died 1763).
- Barrells Hall, Warwickshire. Created by Henrietta, Lady Luxborough (died 1756).
- Dolmelynllyn Estate, Gwynedd. Created by William Alexander Madocks (died 1828).

== See also ==
- Cottage orné

== Sources ==
- Christopher Hussey English Gardens and Landscapes, 1700-1750
- Stoddart, John (1801). Remarks on the Local Scenery and Manners in Scotland. Pub. William Miller.
- Royal Botanic Gardens, Kew: George III's ferme ornée at Kew
