= Louis Stanislas de Girardin =

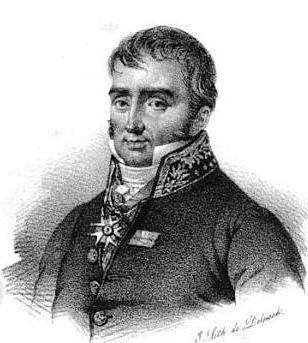
Louis Stanislas de Girardin

Louis Stanislas de Girardin (19 January 1762 – February 1827) was a French general, prefect, and deputy, who was close to Joseph-Napoléon Bonaparte.

== Biography ==
Born in 1762 in Lunéville, Lorraine, Girardin was the son of René-Louis, Marquis de Girardin, a sponsor of Stanisław Leszczyński, the reigning Duke of Lorraine and deposed King of Poland, as well as for tutor Jean-Jacques Rousseau.

Having embraced a career as an army officer, he very quickly achieved the rank of captain in the regiment of Chartres while still very young. Enthusiastic supporter of the Revolution, he wrote the cahiers de doléances of the bailiwick of Senlis, but was not elected to the National Assembly (French Revolution). Instead, he was appointed President of the department of the Oise (1790).

He was elected to the Legislative Assembly (1791). He presided over its sessions 24 June - 8 July 1792, in the turbulent period following the Protests of 20 June 1792.

He was sent on a mission to London after the fall of the French Monarchy,

Under the French Consulate, Girardin sat on the corps législatif of which he became president in 1802.

Girardin was always close to Joseph Bonaparte, and he joined his service among his troops, first in Naples, then in Spain. He became a brigade general in 1810.

He became prefect of the Seine-Inferieure in 1812, and was not ejected by the first restoration of the French Monarchy, instead passing to the prefecture of the Seine-et-Oise. During the Hundred Days, he sat in the House of Representatives, and fell in disgrace to the second restoration of the French Monarchy, yet received the prefecture of the Côte-d'Or a few years later, in 1819.

This same year, the voters of the Seine-Inferieure, who had retained the best recollection of the former administrator of their department, elected him as their deputy to the Chamber of Deputies. Girardin came to sit at the left side, with which he voted consistently.

The independence of which he made evidence, especially on the occasion of the laws of exception proposed following the assassination of the duke of Berry, strongly led the department, which withdrew its-prefecture on 3 April 1820.

When in 1823 Spain rebelled to regain their constitutional freedoms, of Stanislas Girardin descended, in full House, this insurrection of heroic, and as the right-hand side him shouting that it was the apology of the revolt: "Know, gentlemen, he said, that the peoples who are returning to their rights are not of peoples revolts."

He died in 1827 and the following year his Journal et Souvenirs was published.
