= Henrietta Knight, Lady Luxborough =

English poet, letter writer and gardener

The Right Honourable The Lady Luxborough
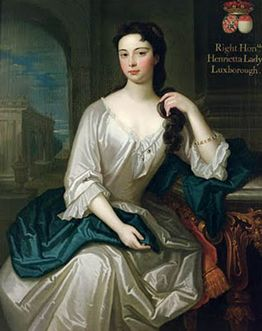
- Portrait of Lady Luxborough by Maria Verelst
- Born: Henrietta St John; 15 July 1699
- Died: 26 March 1756 (aged 56)
- Occupation: Poet
- Spouse: Robert Knight, 1st Earl of Catherlough (m. 1727)
- Children: 3
- Father: Henry, Viscount St John

Henrietta Knight, Baroness Luxborough (née St John; 15 July 1699 — 26 March 1756), was an English poet and letter writer, now mainly remembered as a gardener. She married the rising politician Robert Knight in 1727, but he banished her to his estate at Barrells Hall in 1736 as punishment for a romantic indiscretion. Horace Walpole's correspondence suggests she was caught by her husband in flagrante delicto with her doctor, whilst other sources add a further lover in the form of a young cleric named John Dalton (1709–1763).

As Henrietta, Lady Luxborough (from 1745), she was one of the first to establish a ferme ornée and is credited by the OED with at least the first recorded use, if not the invention, of the word "shrubbery". She was a prominent member of the Warwickshire Coterie, a group of poet friends including the gardener and poet William Shenstone, who had developed his own ferme ornée at The Leasowes in Halesowen, Shropshire. She remained married to her husband, but died before his final elevations in the peerage to a viscountcy and then 1st Earl of Catherlough.

== Parentage ==
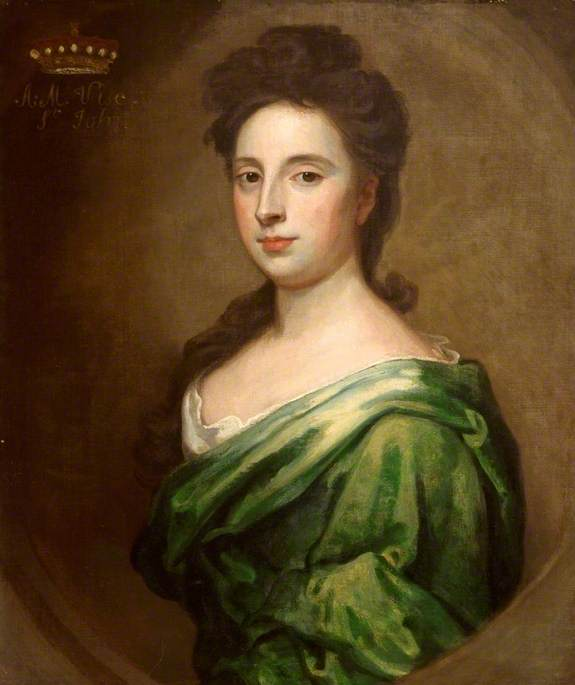
Her mother, née Angelica Pelissary or Pillesary

She was the only daughter of Henry, Viscount St John, by his second wife, Angelica Magdalena, daughter of Georges Pillesary, treasurer-general of the marines, and superintendent of the ships and galleys of France under Louis XIV. Henry St John, 1st Viscount Bolingbroke, was her half-brother.

== Marriage ==
On 20 June 1727, Henrietta St John married Robert Knight of Barrells Hall, Warwickshire, who became Lord Luxborough in 1745. The marriage fell under an early cloud when her husband suspected her of an affair with her physician, Charles Peters. Horace Walpole describes her as wearing a portrait of her husband in her hair. Another suspicion caused the breakdown of the marriage. John Dalton was a tutor in the household of the Hertfords, where Frances Seymour, Countess of Hertford, was Henrietta's friend. Knight found love letters from Henrietta to Dalton, accused her of becoming pregnant by him, and arranged a separation, in 1736. Dalton had been employed as tutor to the children of Henrietta's close friend Frances Thynne (1699–1754), known until 1748 as Lady Hertford, wife of Algernon Seymour, 7th Duke of Somerset. Dalton went on to become prebendary of Worcester Cathedral and rector of St Mary-at-Hill Church, London, as his large funerary slab in the crypt of the cathedral reveals. He was also noted for his poetic works.

== Later life ==
Henrietta Knight went to live on her husband's estate at Barrells Hall, which she had laid out in the emerging style of English landscape gardening. Here she was within easy reach of her friend and correspondent William Shenstone, whom she frequently visited at The Leasowes, and with whom she kept up a regular correspondence. Shenstone celebrated their somewhat artificial Arcadia in his ode on Rural Elegance, addressed to the Duchess of Somerset (1750). Another friend was the poet William Somervile.

The word shrubbery is first recorded by the OED in a letter of hers in 1748 to Shenstone: "Nature has been so remarkably kind this last Autumn to adorn my Shrubbery with the flowers that usually blow at Whitsuntide".

Dying towards the end of March 1756, Henrietta Knight was buried in the church of Wootton Wawen; her remains were later removed to a mausoleum near Barrells Halls. She had been assumed to share her half-brother's atheism, but took the sacrament on her deathbed.

== Works ==
Lady Luxborough's Letters to William Shenstone, Esq. were published by Robert Dodsley, London, 1775. Four poems, printed as "by a lady of quality" in Dodsley's Collection of Poems by several hands (1775), iv. 313, are attributed to her by Horace Walpole. The poems deal with the weather or nature, and in particular, the sprit of English landscape gardening is expressed in:

Written at a Ferme Ornee near Birmingham; August 7th, 1749.

'TIS Nature here bids pleasing scenes arise,
And wisely gives them Cynthio, to revise:
To veil each blemish; brighten every grace;
Yet still preserve the lovely Parent's face.
How well the bard obeys, each valley tells;
These lucid streams, gay meads, and lonely cells;
Where modest art in silence lurks conceal'd:
While Nature shines, so gracefully reveal'd,
That she triumphant claims the total plan;
And, with fresh pride, adopts the work of man.

Other correspondence appeared in Thomas Hull's Select Letters between the late Duchess of Somerset, Lady Luxborough … and others, London, 1778, 2 vols.

== Family ==
By Lord Luxborough, she had a son, Henry, who married, 21 June 1750, a daughter of Thomas Heath of Stanstead, Essex, and died without issue in the lifetime of his father. There were also two daughters, one of whom married a French count. The other, Henrietta, married Charles Wymondesold of Lockinge, Berkshire. Eloping in 1753 with Josiah Child, son of Richard Child, 1st Earl Tylney, she was divorced, and married her lover on 7 May 1754.
