= William Somervile =

English poet (1675–1742)

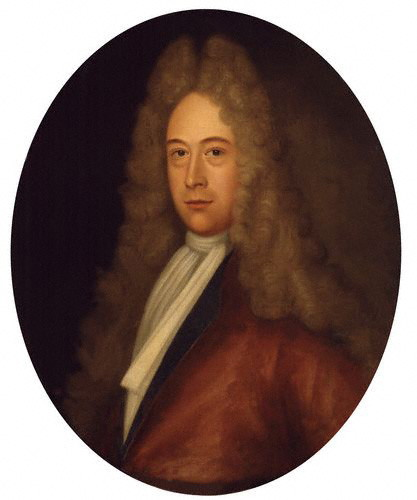
William Somervile

William Somervile or Somerville (2 September 1675 – 17 July 1742) was an English poet who wrote in many genres and is especially remembered for "The Chace", in which he pioneered an early English georgic.

== Life ==
Somervile, the eldest son of a long established country family, was born in Staffordshire in 1677. He was a descendant of Roger de Somerville, of an English branch of the Somerville Family. William raised at the family seat of Edstone, near Wootton Wawen in Warwickshire. He was educated at Winchester College and at New College, Oxford, and then studied law at the Middle Temple. After his father's death in 1705 he lived on his estate and devoted himself to the field sports which were eventually to supply the subjects of his best-known poems. Among his friends and neighbours were the poets William Shenstone, Richard Jago and George Lyttelton, 1st Baron Lyttelton. Later he was a correspondent of Allan Ramsay and they exchanged poems. But Somervile's convivial hospitality strained his small personal income and plunged him into debt. Eventually he took to drinking heavily and died on 17 July 1742 at the age of 66. After his death he was buried in the church at Wootton Wawen and his estate passed to James Lord Somerville under an arrangement in which Lord Somerville had lent him money to pay his debts.

Following Somervile's death, William Shenstone paid him a tribute in a letter which hints at the strained relations with his friends in later life:

Our old friend Somervile is dead! I did not imagine I could have been so sorry as I find myself on the occasion. Sublatum querimus. I can now excuse all his foibles: impute them to age, and to distress of circumstances. The last of these circumstances wrings my very soul to think on. For a man of high spirit, conscious of having (at least in one production) generally pleased the world, to be plagued and threatened by wretches that are low in every sense: to be forced to drink himself into pains of the body, in order to get rid of pains of the mind, is misery indeed.

== Poetry ==
Somervile's publications were The Two Springs (1725), a fable; Occasional Poems (1727); The Chace ("The Chase") (1735); Hobbinol, or the Rural Games (1740), a burlesque poem describing the Cotswold Games; and Field Sports (1742), a poem on hawking. The poems continued to be republished for the best part of a century after they first appeared but, The Chace apart, criticism of them was generally guarded. For Samuel Johnson, "Somervile has tried many modes of poetry; and though perhaps he has not in any reached such excellence as to raise much envy, it may commonly be said at least, that "he writes very well for a gentleman"... His subjects are commonly such as require no great depth of thought or energy of expression. His fables are generally stale and therefore excite no curiosity."

In the eyes of John Aikin, a little later, "He is strictly and almost solely a descriptive poet…Little occurs in his writings that indicates a mind inspired by that exalted enthusiasm which denotes the genius of superior rank. His versification is generally correct and well varied, and evidently flows from a nice and practiced ear… His Chase is probably the best performance upon that topic which any country has produced." But by the time of The Cambridge History of English Literature (1913), the attitude is plainly dismissive: "Much of his verse is poor doggerel in the form of fables and tales, dull and coarse after the usual manner of such productions". Such a judgment might certainly be applied to a performance like "The Fortune Hunter", in which La Fontaine's fable of The Man who Runs after Fortune (VII.12) is expanded into five cantos that ramble over sixty pages.

Other fables have a more subtle agenda, however. Though they may be Aesopic at base, often the original storyline is modified so as to make a contemporary statement. The situation of the ancient fable of the lion, the boar and the vultures has been given the modern context of bear-baiting in which the dog and bear contestants suddenly gain an insight into how their virtues are being exploited in ways that harm rather than benefit themselves. Again, the story of The Trumpeter Taken Captive takes place against a background of contemporary Anglo-French military rivalry and is directed against those who stir up war, from which they profit without taking part. Both fables were written at a time when Robert Walpole was commanding popular support for a pacific foreign policy and accord with the spirit of the time.

The fashion for fable-writing was at its height when Somervile produced his. Though there is some novelty in his approach, his discursive talent was better suited to The Chace, the work for which he is best remembered. That poem was also only the period's third georgic poem on an English subject, having been preceded by Cyder (1708) by John Philips and Rural Sports (1713) by John Gay. It consists of four cantos, the first of which introduces the subject and covers the management of hounds. The second canto deals with hare hunting and the third with fox hunting, while the fourth covers otter hunting and the breeding and care of hounds. The poem passed through many editions, some of the later including the two poems on country pursuits that followed it. Among the illustrators of the poem have been Thomas Bewick (1796); Thomas Stothard (1800); John Scott (engravings based on paintings by John Nott Sartorius, 1804); and Hugh Thomson (1896).

== Images for Somervile's sporting poetry ==
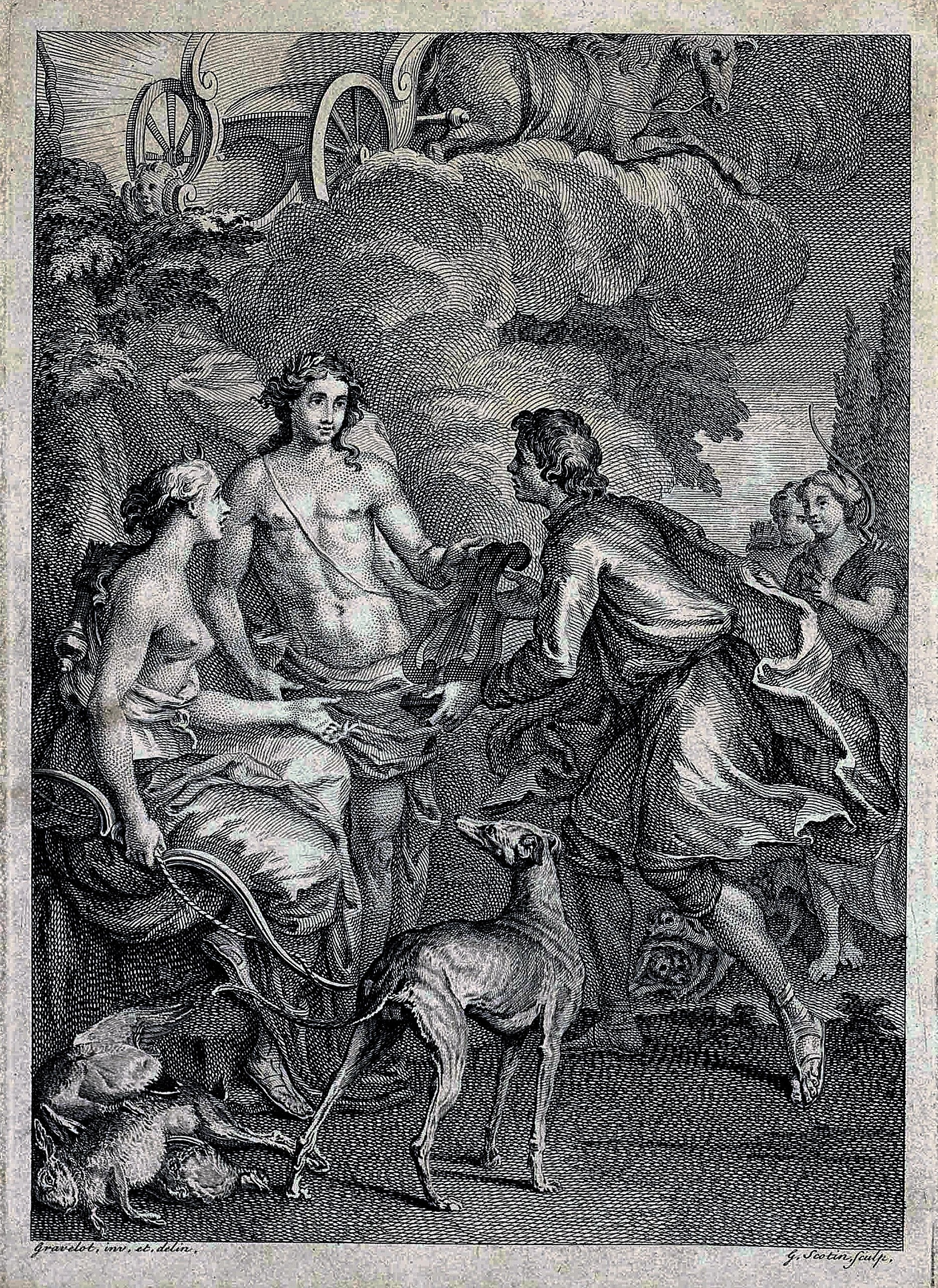
Gérard Jean-Baptiste II Scotin after Hubert-François Gravelot. Frontispiece in "The Chace. A Poem" by William Somervile, 1735

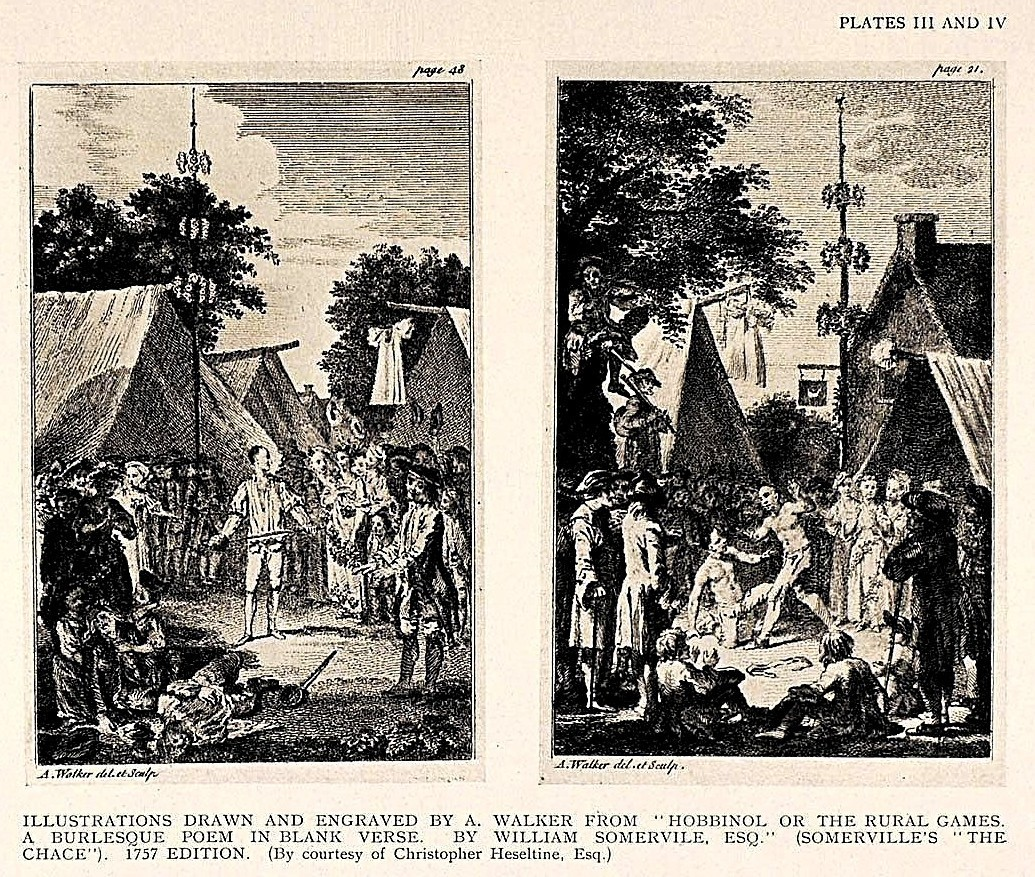
Two illustrations drawn and engraved by Anthony Walker from Hobbinol or the Rural Games, 1757

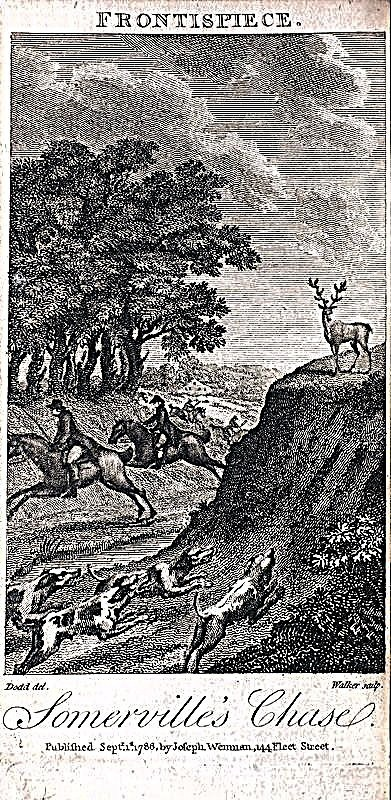
1786 engraved frontispiece after Daniel Dodd for The Chase

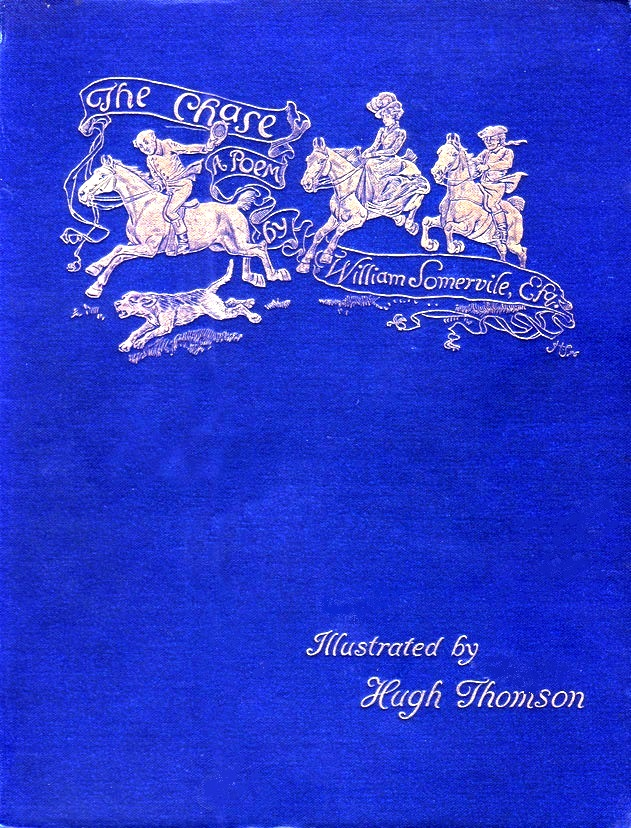
Hugh Thomson's cover vignette for the 1896 illustrated edition of The Chase
Images from The Chase by John & Thomas Bewick, 1802

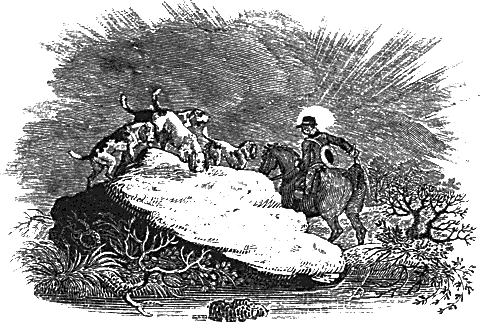

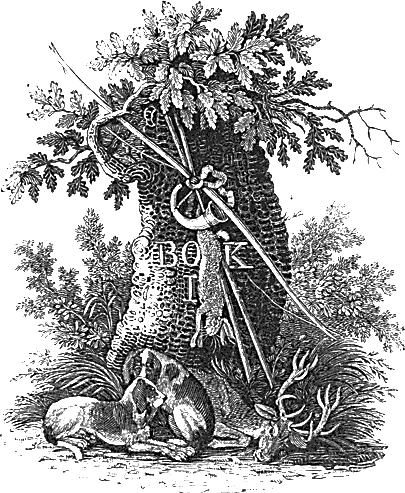

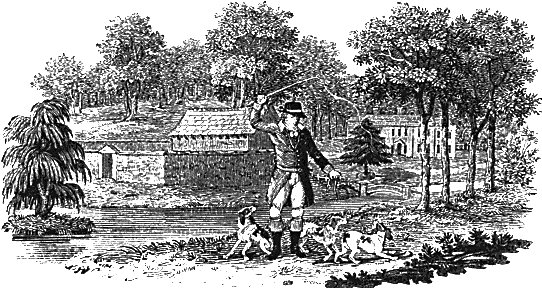

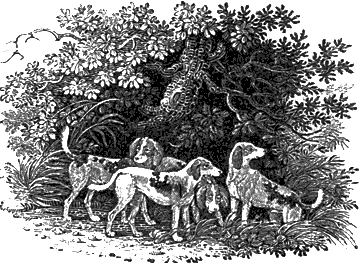

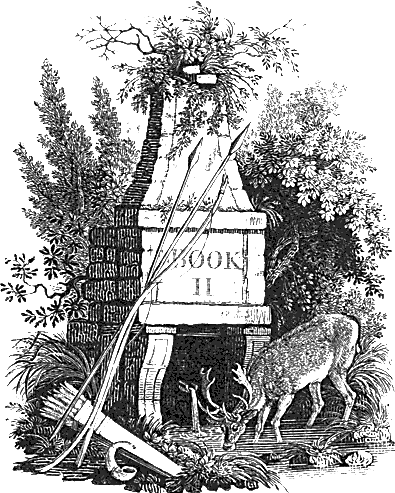

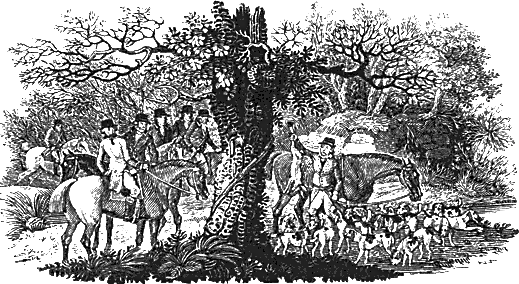

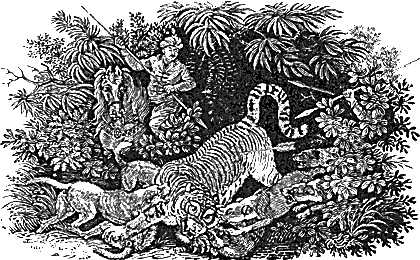

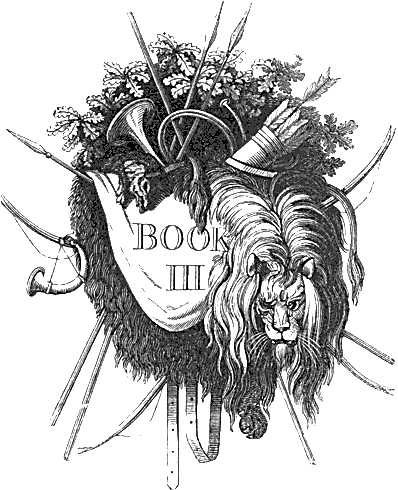

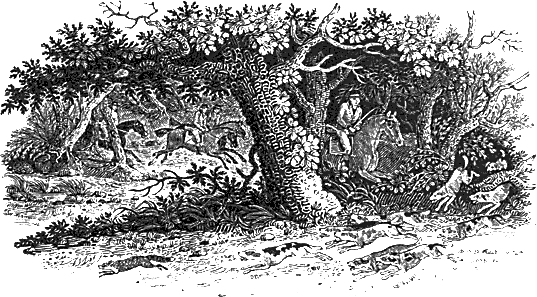

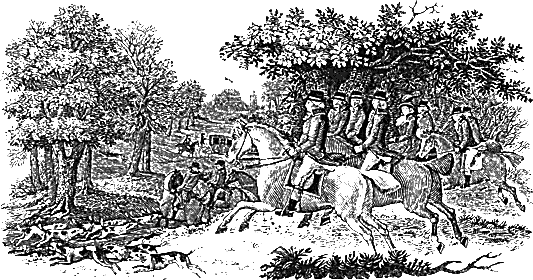

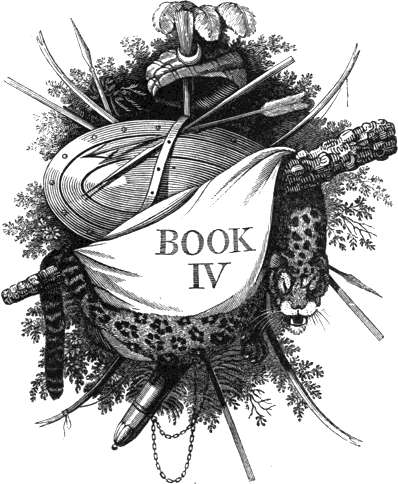

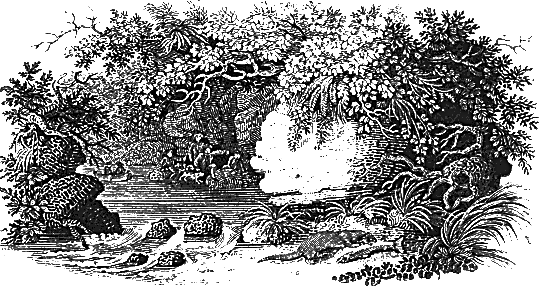

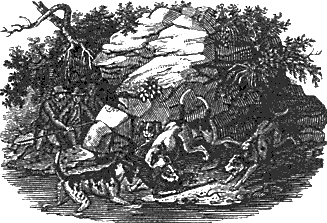

== Ancestry ==
Ancestors of William Somervile

8. Sir William Somerville
4. William Somerville
9. Cecilia Shirley
2. Robert Somerville of Edstone
10. Sir Robert Tracy
5. Anne Tracy
11. Bridget Lyttelton
1. William Somerville
12. Sir Robert Wolseley
6. Sir Charles Wolseley
13. Mary Wroughton
3. Elizabeth Wolseley
14. William Fiennes
7. Ann Fiennes
15. Elizabeth Temple
