= John Pixell =

English poet, priest and composer

John Prynne Parkes Pixell (1725 – 1784) was an English poet, priest and composer.

== Background ==
Pixell was educated at the Birmingham Free School and at Queen's College, Oxford. He became the vicar of Edgbaston in 1751,

== Published works ==
One of his poems, "Transcrib'd from the Rev. Mr Pixell's Parsonage Garden" was published in Robert Dodsley's 1758 anthology A Collection of Poems in Six Volumes: by Several Hands.

Pixell published two collections of songs, A Collection of Songs with their Recitatives and Symphonies for the German Flute, Violins, etc., with a Thorough Bass for the Harpsichord, which was published in Birmingham in 1759 and with a title page and subscription list printed by John Baskerville, and Odes, Cantatas, Songs, etc., divine, moral, entertaining, op.2 , published in Birmingham in 1775.
