= William Shenstone =

English poet and gardener

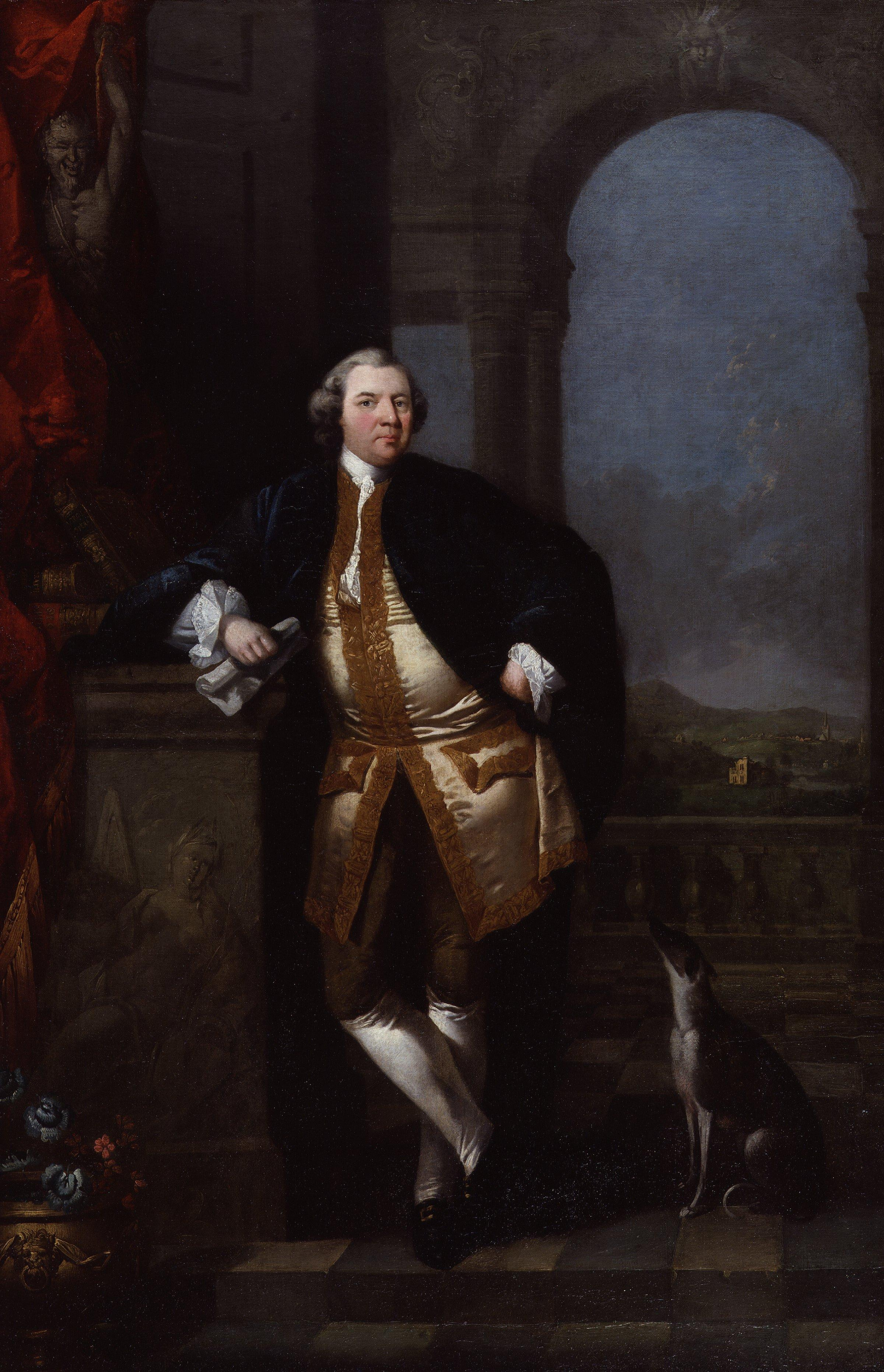
- Portrait by Edward Alcock, 1760
- Born: 18 November 1714; Leasowes, Halesowen, England
- Died: 11 February 1763 (aged 48)
- Resting place: St John the Baptist Church, Halesowen
- Education: Pembroke College, Oxford
- Occupations: Poet, landscape gardener
- Writing career
- Notable work: The Schoolmistress

William Shenstone (18 November 1714 – 11 February 1763) was an English poet and one of the earliest practitioners of landscape gardening through the development of his estate, The Leasowes.

== Biography ==
Son of Thomas Shenstone and Anne Penn, daughter of William Penn of Harborough Hall, then in Hagley (now Blakedown), Shenstone was born at the Leasowes, Halesowen on 18 November 1714. At that time this was an exclave of Shropshire within the county of Worcestershire and now in the West Midlands. Shenstone received part of his formal education at Halesowen Grammar School (now The Earls High School). In 1741, Shenstone became bailiff to the feoffees of Halesowen Grammar School.

While attending Solihull School, he began a lifelong friendship with Richard Jago. He went up to Pembroke College, Oxford in 1732 and made another firm friend there in Richard Graves, the author of The Spiritual Quixote.

Shenstone took no degree, but, while still at Oxford, he published Poems on various occasions, written for the entertainment of the author (1737). This edition was intended for private circulation only but, containing the first draft of The Schoolmistress, it attracted some wider attention. Shenstone tried hard to suppress it but in 1742 he published anonymously a revised draft of The Schoolmistress, a Poem in imitation of Spenser. The inspiration of the poem was Sarah Lloyd, teacher of the village school where Shenstone received his first education. Isaac D'Israeli contended that Robert Dodsley had been misled in publishing it as one of a sequence of Moral Poems, its intention having been satirical, as evidenced by the ludicrous index appended to its original publication.

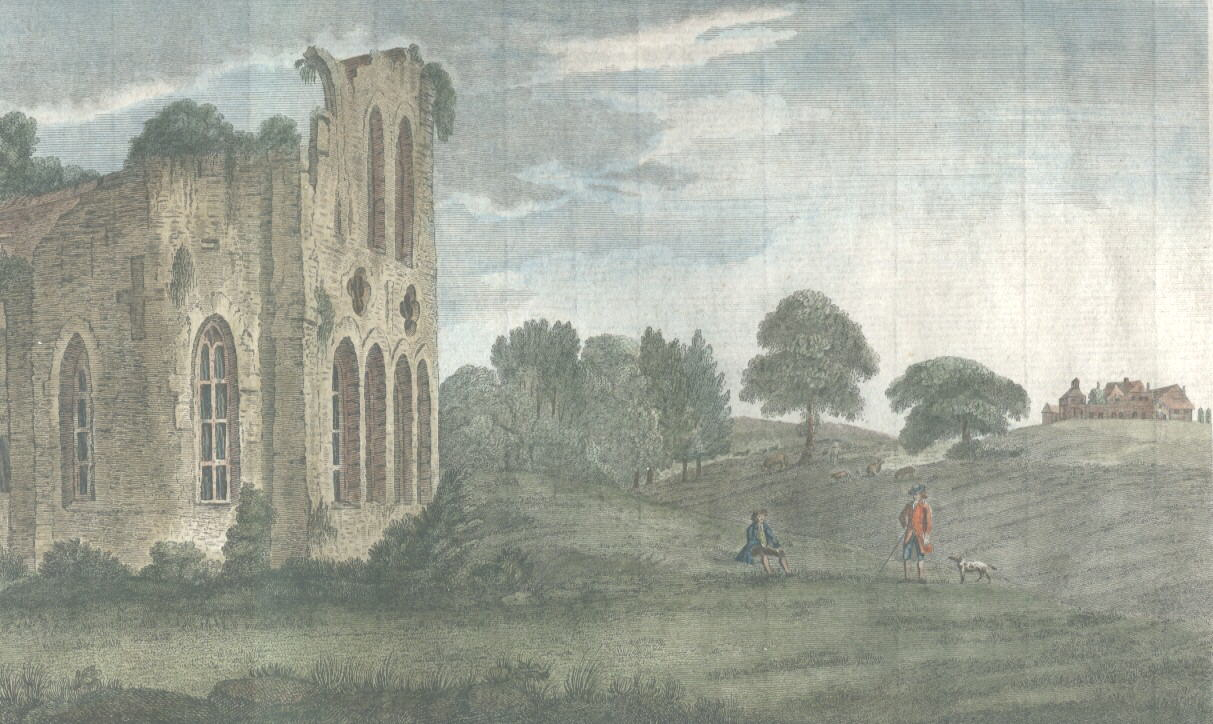
The view from the ruined Halesowen Priory towards The Leasowes (on the crest of the hill on the right).

In 1741 he published The Judgment of Hercules. He inherited the Leasowes estate, and retired there in 1745 to undertake what proved the chief work of his life, the beautifying of his property. He embarked on elaborate schemes of landscape gardening which gave The Leasowes a wide celebrity (see ferme ornée), but sadly impoverished the owner. Shenstone was not a contented recluse. He desired constant admiration of his gardens, and he never ceased to lament his lack of fame as a poet.

In 1759, Shenstone made the acquaintance of James Woodhouse, a shoe-maker from nearby Rowley Regis who had started writing poetry. Shenstone encouraged Woodhouse's literary efforts, allowing him access to the library at the Leasowes and including one of Woodhouse's works in a collection of poems published in 1762.

Shenstone died unmarried on 11 February 1763.

== Critical appraisal ==
Shenstone's poems of nature were written in praise of its most artificial aspects, but the emotions they express were obviously genuine. His Schoolmistress was admired by Oliver Goldsmith, with whom Shenstone had much in common, and his Elegies written at various times and to some extent biographical in character won the praise of Robert Burns who, in the preface to Poems, chiefly in the Scottish Dialect (1786), called him ... that celebrated poet whose divine elegies do honour to our language, our nation and our species. The best example of purely technical skill in his works is perhaps his success in the management of the anapaestic trimeter in his Pastoral Ballad in Four Parts (written in 1743), but first printed in Dodsley's Collection of Poems (vol. iv., 1755).

Arthur Schopenhauer mentioned Shenstone in his discussion of equivocation. "[C]oncepts", Schopenhauer asserted, "which in and by themselves contain nothing improper, yet the actual case brought under them leads to an improper conception" are called equivocations. He continued:

But a perfect specimen of a sustained and magnificent equivocation is Shenstone's incomparable epitaph on a justice of the peace, which in its high-sounding lapidary style appears to speak of noble and sublime things, whereas under each of their concepts something quite different is to be subsumed, which appears only in the last word of all as the unexpected key to the whole, and the reader discovers with loud laughter that he has read merely a very obscene equivocation. (Note: This poem about the passing of wind, entitled Inscription, can be read at Inscription.)

== Bibliography ==
Shenstone's works were first published by his friend Robert Dodsley (3 vols., 1764–1769). The second volume contains Dodsley's description of the Leasowes. The last, consisting of correspondence with Graves, Jago and others, appeared after Dodsley's death. Other letters of Shenstone's are included in Select Letters (ed. Thomas Hill 1778). The letters of Lady Luxborough (née Henrietta St John) to Shenstone were printed by T. Dodsley in 1775; much additional correspondence is preserved in the British Museum letters to Lady Luxborough (Add. MS. 28958), Dodsley's letters to Shenstone (Add. MS. 28959), and correspondence between Shenstone and Bishop Percy from 1757 to 1763 the last being of especial interest; To Shenstone was due the original suggestion of Percy's Reliques, a service which would alone entitle him to a place among the precursors of the romantic movement in English literature.

In a letter written in 1741 Shenstone became the first person to record the use of "floccinaucinihilipilification". In the first edition of the Oxford English Dictionary this was recognised as the longest word in the English language. The word shrubbery is first recorded by the OED in a letter of Lady Luxborough in 1748 to Shenstone: "Nature has been so remarkably kind this last Autumn to adorn my Shrubbery with the flowers that usually blow at Whitsuntide".

== Memorials ==
- One of the five houses of Solihull School is named after him.
- One of the four houses of The Earls High School (formerly Halesowen Grammar School) is named after him.
- Solihull School's annual publication is named after him – The Shenstonian.
- Louis-René Girardin built a memorial in the French town of Ermenonville.
- A prominent public house (pub) in Halesowen (Queensway) is named "The William Shenstone". The walls are adorned with engravings of The Leasowes in Shenstone's time.
- Two roads in the area near to his home in the Leasowes Park are named in his honour: Shenstone Valley Road and Shenstone Avenue. Landscape architect Frederick Law Olmsted named Shenstone Road in Riverside, Illinois after him.

== See also ==
- List of abolitionist forerunners

== Sources ==
- Aitken, George Atherton (1897). "Shenstone, William" . In Lee, Sidney (ed.). Dictionary of National Biography. Vol. 52. London: Smith, Elder & Co. pp. 48–50.
- Schopenhauer, Arthur (1969), "Chapter 7", The World as Will and Representation, vol. 2, Dover Publications9, p. 94

Attribution:

- . Endnotes see also:
  - Richard Graves, Recollections of some particulars in the Life of the Late William Shenstone (1788);
  - H. Sydney Grazebrook, The Family of Shenstone the Poet (1890); Lennox Morison,
  - " Shenstone," in the Gentleman't Magazine (vol. 289, 1900, pp. 196–205);
  - Alexander Chalmers, English Poets (1810, vol. xiii.), with " Life " by Samuel Johnson;
  - "The Poetical Works of William Shenstone" (in Library Edition of the British Poets, 1854), with " Life " by George Gilfillan;
  - T. D'Israeli, " The Domestic Life of a Poet: Shenstone vindicated," in Curiosities of Literature;
  - " Burns and Shenstone," in Furth in Field (1894), by " Hugh Haliburton " (J. L. Robertson).
