= The Leasowes =

Estate in England

Coordinates: 52.454578°N 2.030067°W

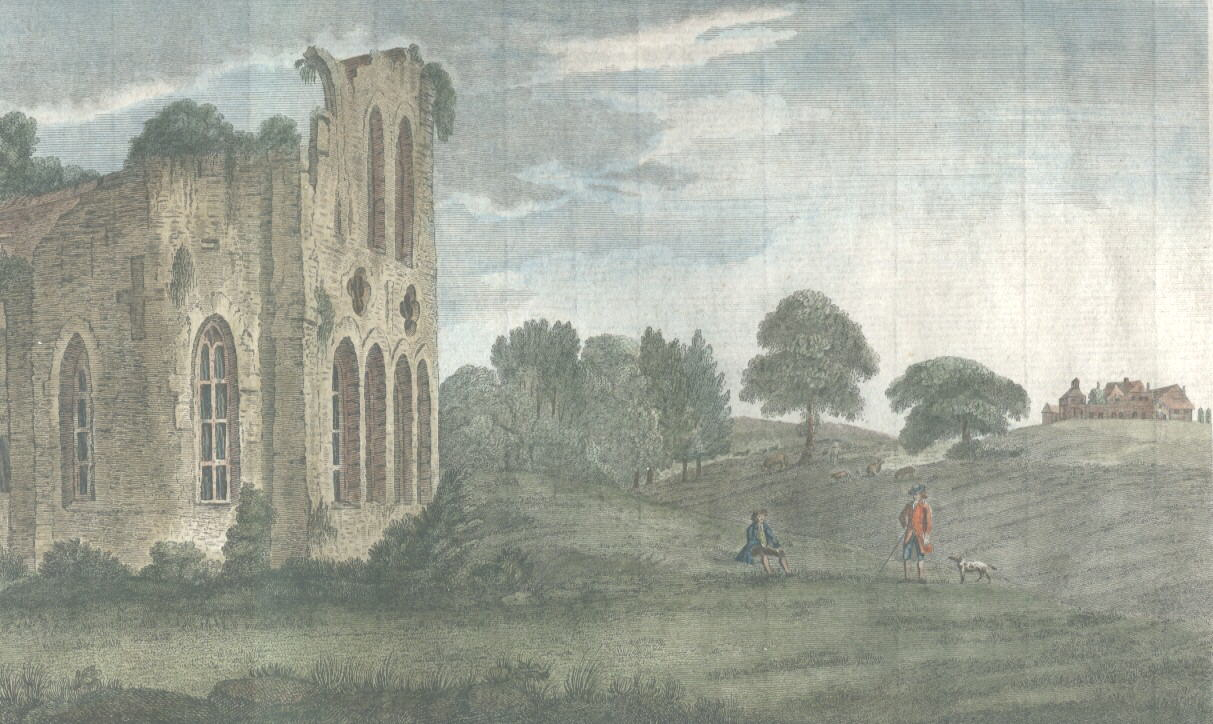
The view from the ruined Halesowen Priory towards The Leasowes (on the crest of the hill on the right). It shows the house as it was during the lifetime of William Shenstone.

The Leasowes /ˈlɛzəz/ is a 57-hectare (around 141 acre) estate in Halesowen, historically in the county of Shropshire, later (from 1844) Worcestershire, England, comprising house and gardens. The parkland is now listed Grade I on English Heritage's Register of Parks and Gardens and the home of the Halesowen Golf Club. The name means "rough pasture land". (Note: "Leasowe, a common provincial term, is of Saxon origin, is often found in legal documents, and was never before, perhaps, so classically applied as in this instance" (Luckcock 1824, p. 399).)

== Shenstone (1743 to 1763) ==
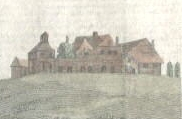
The house as it was during the lifetime of William Shenstone.

Developed between 1743 and 1763 by poet William Shenstone as a ferme ornée, the garden is one of the most admired early examples of the English garden. Its importance lies in its simplicity and the uncompromisingly rural appearance. Thomas Whately praises it in chapter LII of his Observations on Modern Gardening of 1770:

The ideas of pastoral poetry seem now to be the standard of that simplicity; and a place conformable to them is deemed a farm in its utmost purity. An allusion to them evidently enters into the design of the Leasowes, where they appear so lovely as to endear the memory of their author; and justify the reputation of Mr. Shenstone … every part is rural and natural. It is literally a grazing farm lying round the house; and a walk as unaffected and as unadorned as a common field path, is conducted through the several enclosures. [After this passage, Whately goes on to describe every detail].

== Horne (1763 to 1789) ==
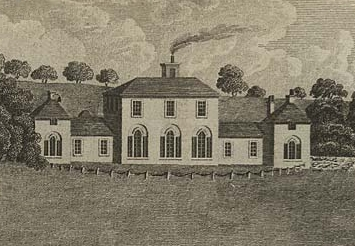
The Leasowes c. 1776. This engraving is of the small mansion completed in 1776 by Edward Horne who demolished Shenstone's house and built his mansion on the same site.

Shenstone died in 1763. The house and grounds were purchased by Edward Horne, (Note: Edward Horne is described as Mr. Home in some sources) who demolished Shenstone's house and built a new one on the same site completing it around 1776. He also built a walled garden and a hothouse.

=== Visit of Adams and Jefferson ===
With Whately's treatise guiding him every step of the way, in April 1786, polymath Thomas Jefferson, the future third President of the United States, visited the Leasowes (then owned by Edward Horne) on his tour of English gardens in the company of his close friend and future second President of the US, John Adams.

Adams wrote in his diary:

Stowe, Hagley, and Blenheim, are superb; Woburn, Caversham, and the Leasowes are beautiful. Wotton is both great and elegant, though neglected ... Shenstone's Leasowes is the simplest and plainest, but the most rural of all. I saw no spot so small that exhibited such a variety of beauties.

Jefferson's more purposeful and inquisitive account in his Notes of a Tour of English Gardens delivers some additional background:

Leasowes. In Shropshire. Now the property of Mr. Horne by purchase. 150. as. within the walk. The waters small. This is not even an ornamented farm. It is only a grazing farm with a path round it. Here and there a seat of board, rarely any thing better. Architecture has contributed nothing. The obelisk is of brick. Shenstone had but 300£ a year, and ruined himself by what he did to this farm. It is said that he died of the heartaches which his debts occasioned him. The part next the road is of red earth, that on the further part grey. The 1st. and 2d. cascades are beautiful. The landscape at No. 18. and prospect at 32. are fine. The Walk through the wood is umbrageous and pleasing. The whole arch of prospect may be of 90°. Many of the inscriptions are lost.

== Later ownership and developments ==
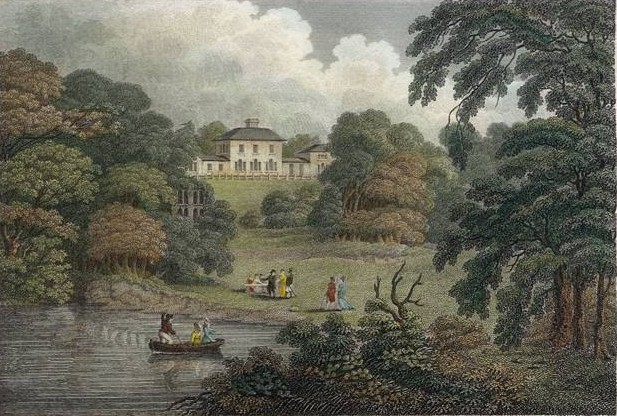
Park and House in the early 19th century when the estate was owned by Charles Hamilton.

In 1789 Edward Horne sold the property to Major Francis Halliday who made considerable additions to the house and parkland. He added a stone portico at the entrance of the house and a folly hermitage in the high wood, which was decorated with "stained glass windows, furnace cinders, cowheel bones, horses' teeth, etc." (this was not in keeping with Shenstone's park improvements).

Halliday died in 1794, at the age of 45. In June 1795, Edward Butler Hartopp became the owner of the estate, and held possession till July 1800, when it was transferred to Charles Hamilton, and when he became insolvent in 1807, it passed into the hands of Matthias Attwood, who unlike the previous owners did not take any action to preserve William Shenstone's park features, and by the 1820s the park grounds had sunk into a "state of ruin and desolation". An extended description of the landscapes of Hagley Park and of the Leasowes in 1845, with reflections on Shenstone, is given by the Scottish geologist Hugh Miller.

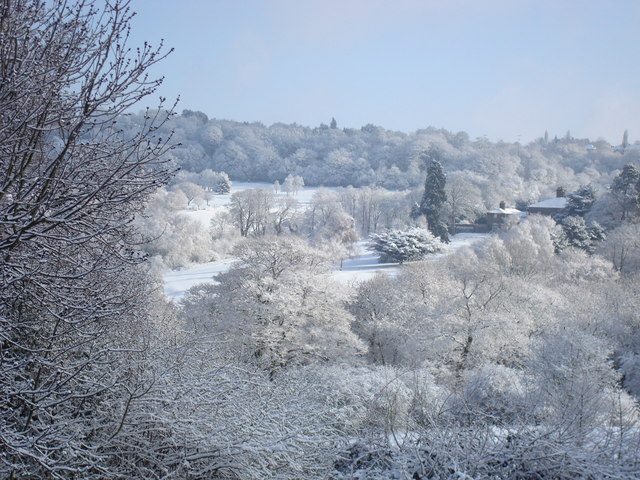
Park and House (centre right obscured by trees), April 2008.

The house, despite being not architecturally outstanding, is Grade I listed in view of its association with Shenstone and its importance in the history of landscape gardening. Between 1897 and 1907, it housed the Anstey College of Physical Education. Part of the site was purchased by the Halesowen Golf Club in 1906. Halesowen Council (later to become Dudley Metropolitan Borough Council) purchased The Leasowes in 1934 and since then the site has been managed as a public park with part of the site leased to Halesowen Golf Club. Neglected since Shenstone's death, restoration of the 18th century landscape began in May 2008 and was completed by January 2009 (several months ahead of schedule). The restoration included the creation of a linear lake in the disused Lapal canal which runs across an earth filled embankbent 60 feet above Breaches pool to the south of the park.
