= Château d'Écouen =

Coordinates: 49°01′03″N 2°22′42″E

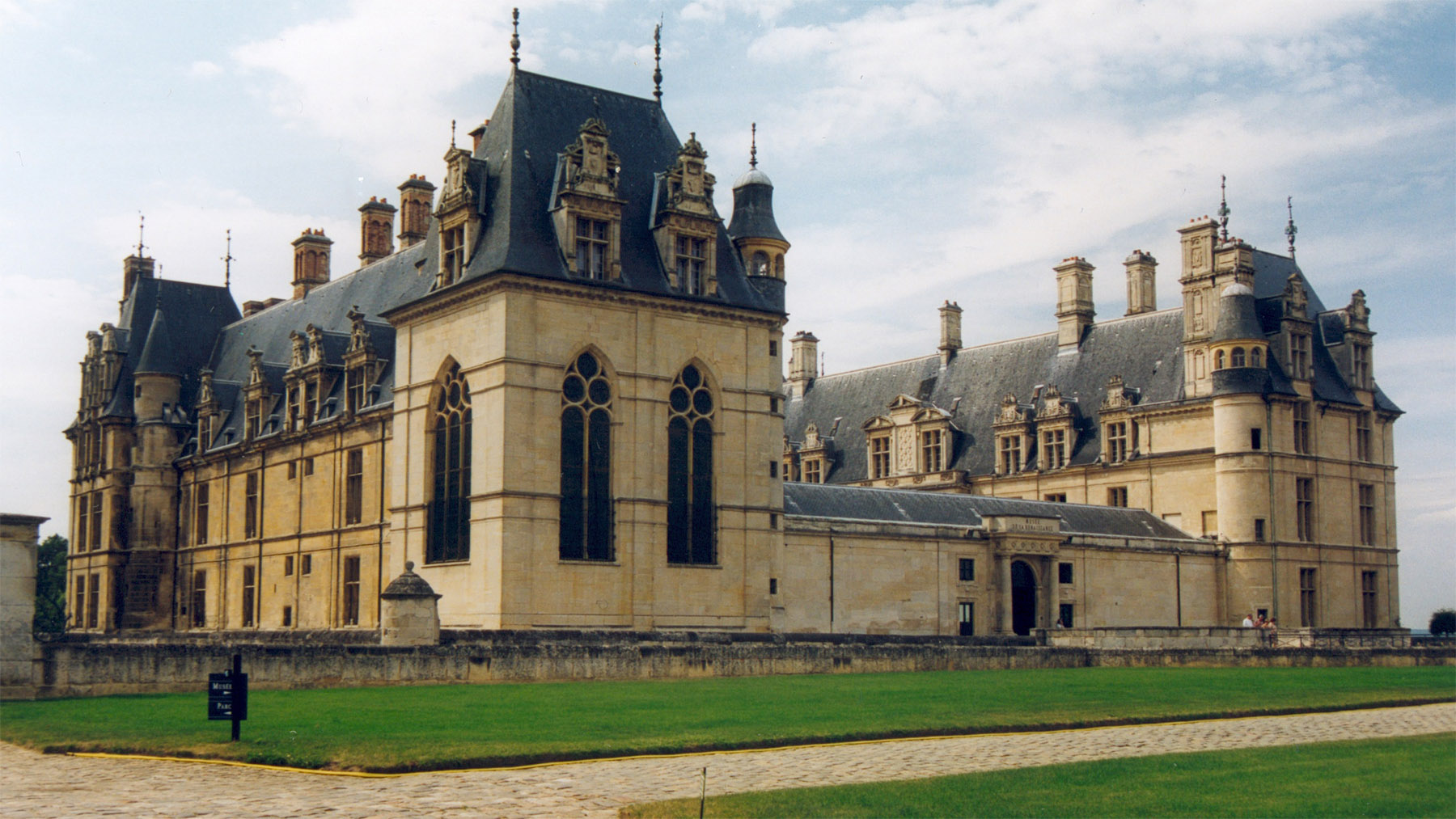
- Interactive map of the Château d'Écouen area

General information
- Type: Château
- Architectural style: French Renaissance
- Location: Écouen, France

Design and construction
- Architects: Jean Bullant (Later courtyard and north porticos, stairways and interiors)

The Château d'Écouen is an historic château in the commune of Écouen, some 20 km north of Paris, France, and a notable example of French Renaissance architecture. Since 1975, it has housed the collections of the Musée national de la Renaissance (National Museum of the Renaissance).

The château was built between 1539 and 1555 for Anne de Montmorency, the Connétable de France or Grand Constable, chief minister and commander of the French army for King Francois I, and later for Henri II. It contains important collections of paintings, sculptures, ceramics, stained glass, furniture, textiles and other arts of the French Renaissance.

== History of the château ==
Records show that a fortress has existed on this hilltop site since the 12th century. The fortress guarded the Plain of France, the historic invasion route from the north. Anne de Montmorency, a nobleman, senior minister and childhood companion of King Francis I, inherited the fortress in 1515. In 1538, the King named Montmorency Constable of France, commander of the armed forces, and the grand master of the household of the King. Montmorency decided to reconstruct the castle completely in order to make it suitable for receiving the King in grand style.

The château was laid out following the plan of the royal Château of Chambord in the Loire Valley. It was set on a terrace overlooking the countryside below, encircled by a false moat with a fortified wall surrounded with bastions, probably symbolizing the Constable's role as commander of the army. The château was in the form of a rectangle around a central courtyard, with square pavilions on the corners. It was composed of two three-story residential wings, connected by a one-story entrance wing. Both of the residential wings had monumental stairways in their centers to provide access to the suites on the upper floors.

The Constable and his wife, Madeleine of Savoy, resided in the south wing, which contained their private chapel and apartments. The north wing was entirely devoted to royal visitors: It contained the suite of the Queen on the first floor and the suite of the King on the floor above. The top floors of the three main wings feature rows of lucarnes, or dormer windows.

Records of the construction have been lost, so the name of the building's original architect is uncertain, but it is known that the royal architect Jean Bullant, who later designed the Grand Constable's tomb, participated in decoration of the château, particularly in the design of the north wing's ornate neo-classical peristyles employing the colossal order, that face both the inner courtyard and the exterior north gardens. Bullant's addition of classical columns and entablature elements to the north wing is an early example of the merging of classical and medieval forms, which became a distinguishing feature of French Renaissance architecture.

Anne de Montmorency invited some of the most prominent French artists of the Renaissance to participate in the sculpture and decoration. His chapel was decorated with sculptures by Jean Goujon, Jean Bullant, Barthélemy Prieur and Bernard Palissy. Some members of the Androuet du Cerceau family found protection and work at Écouen. Much of the glass from Écouen is now at the Musée Condé, and the east wing was paved in 1549-50. The building was frescoed and furnished during the 1550s, in the style of the School of Fontainebleau. No building accounts survive, so it is not possible to follow the precise sequence of the construction. However, panels of grisaille stained glass in the gallery of the west wing are dated 1542 and 1544, and engravings of Écouen were included in Jacques Androuet du Cerceau's Les Plus excellents bastiments de France, 1576.

The château remained in the Montmorency family until 1632, when it became the property of the Bourbon-Condé branch of the royal family. In 1787, shortly before the French Revolution, the original east entrance portal, topped by an equestrian statue of Montmorency, was demolished by the new owner, Louis Joseph de Bourbon, prince de Condé. When he emigrated during the Revolution, the château was confiscated by the French state. In 1806, Napoleon granted the château to the Legion d'Honneur and it became a school for the daughters of the chevaliers of the order. Eugène de Beauharnais erected the Fontaine Hortense in the park. However, after the restoration of Louis XVIII the estate was returned to Louis Henri, Prince of Condé. He left it to Sophie Dawes, Baronne de Feuchères, on condition that she used it to establish an orphanage for the descendants of soldiers in his army, with his residuary heir, Henri d'Orléans, Duke of Aumale, to pay for the running costs. She died in 1840. Little use was made of the property until 1850, ten years after the death of Dawes, when Louis Napoléon Bonaparte decided to reestablish the school of the Legion d'Honneur there, and it continued to serve this purpose until 1962. In 1862, the château was declared a Monument historique. In 1969, Minister of Culture André Malraux proposed that the château become the home of the collection of Renaissance art of the Cluny Museum, and in 1977 it opened as the French National Museum of the Renaissance.

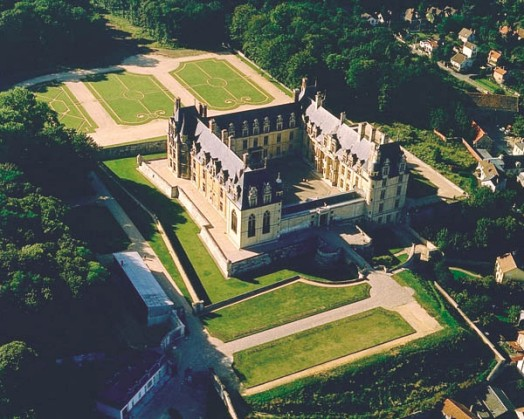
The château viewed from the air

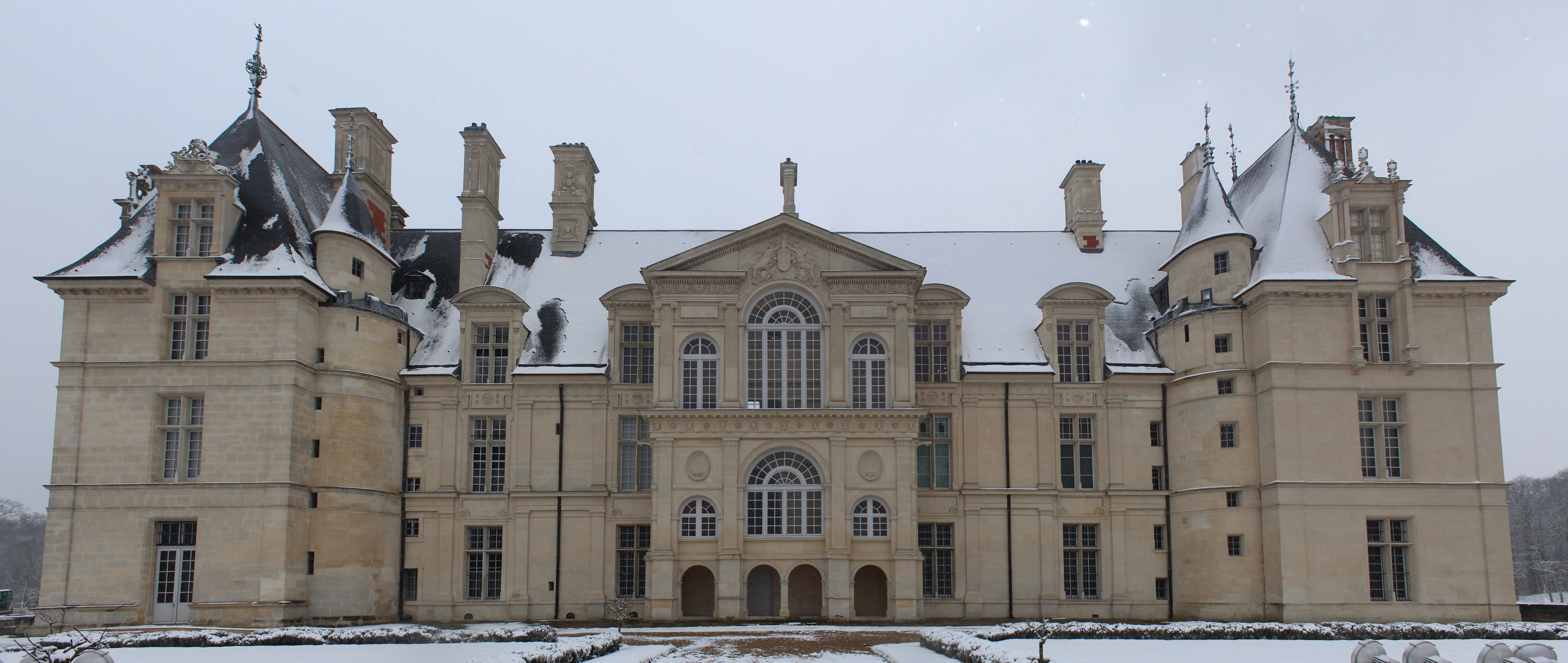
Facade of the north wing, with the peristyle by Jean Bullant covering the stairway to the royal apartments

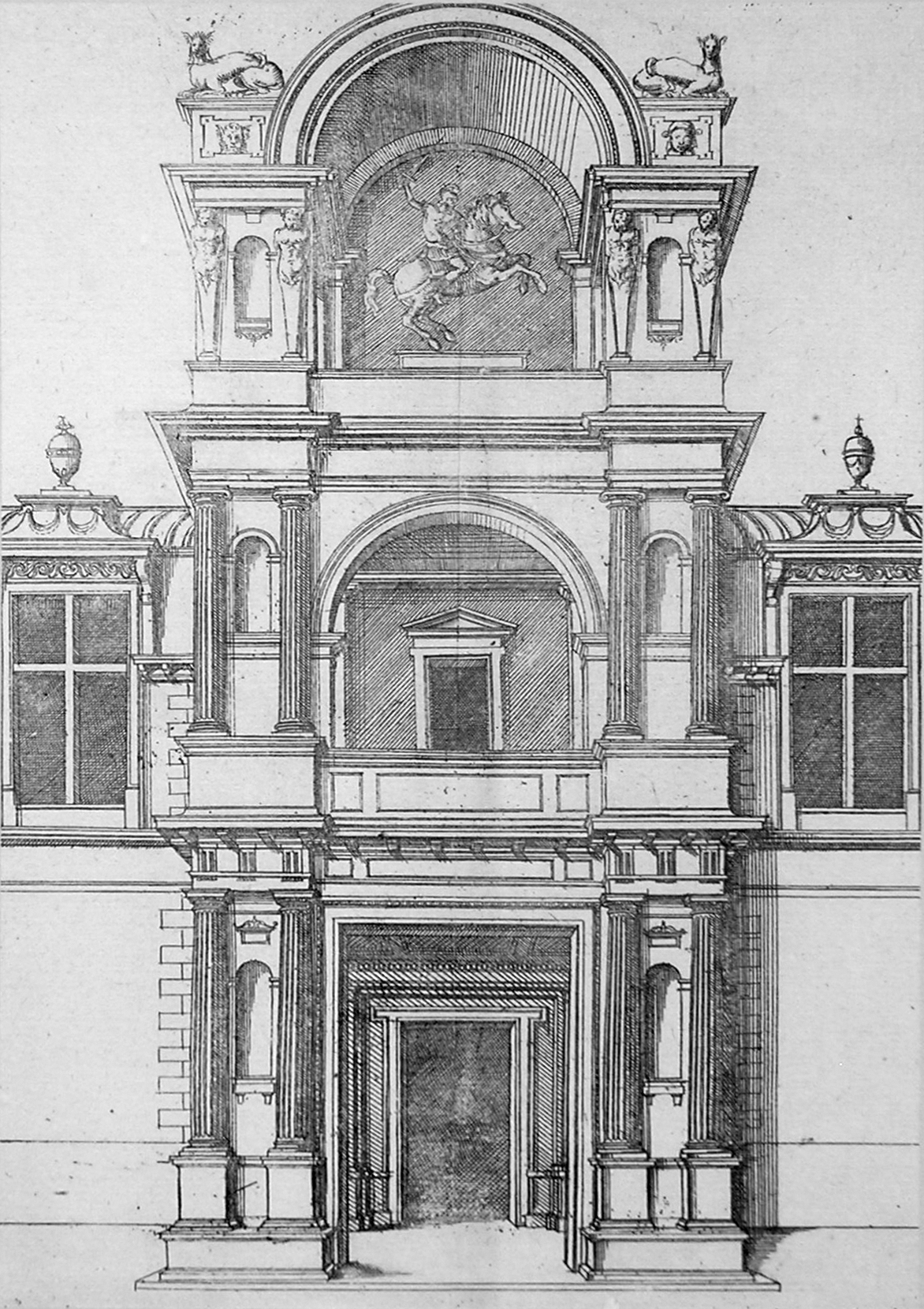
Original entry portal, with equestrian statue of Anne de Montmorency, drawn by Jacques Androuet du Cerceau

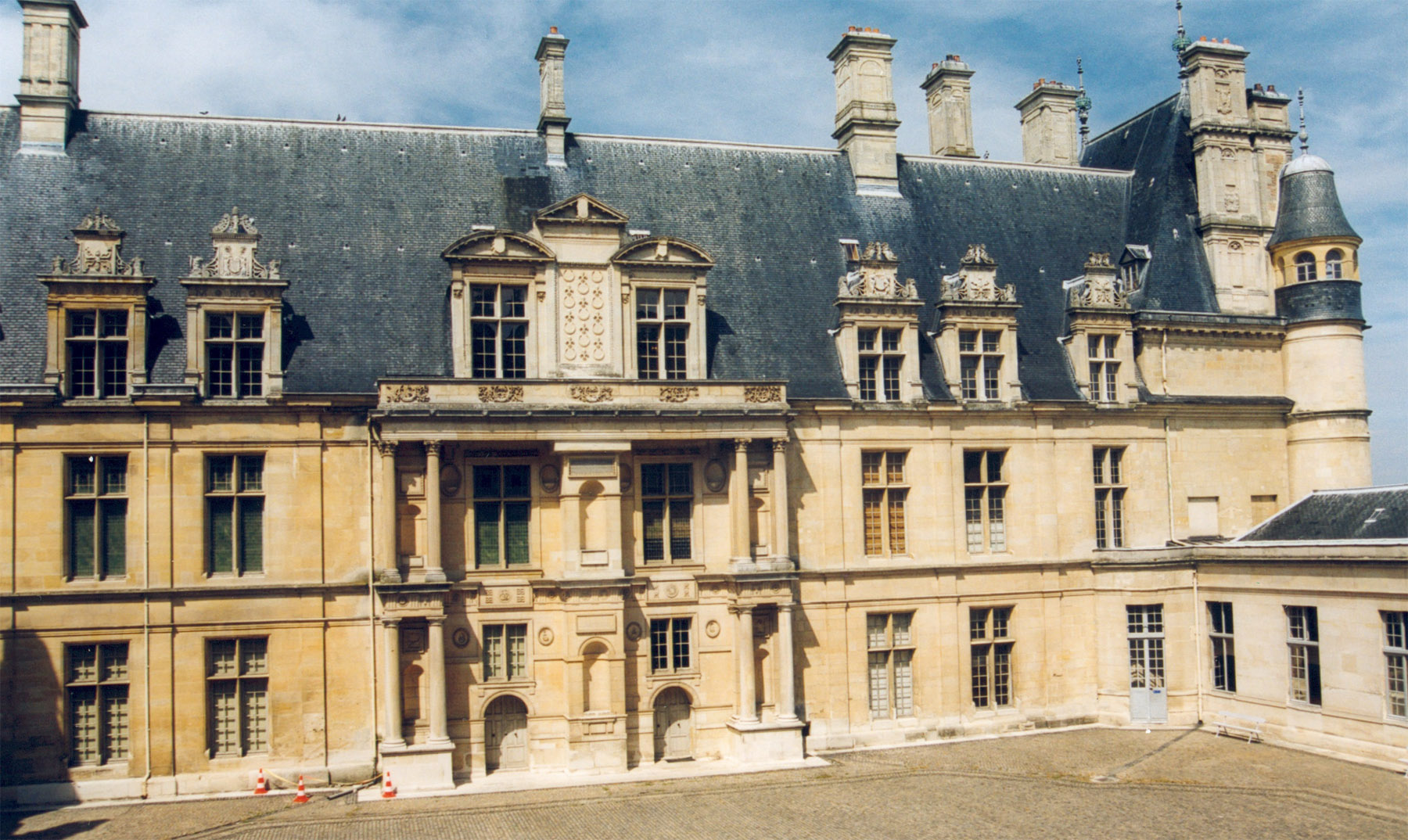
Courtyard entrance to the north wing, attributed to Jean Bullant.

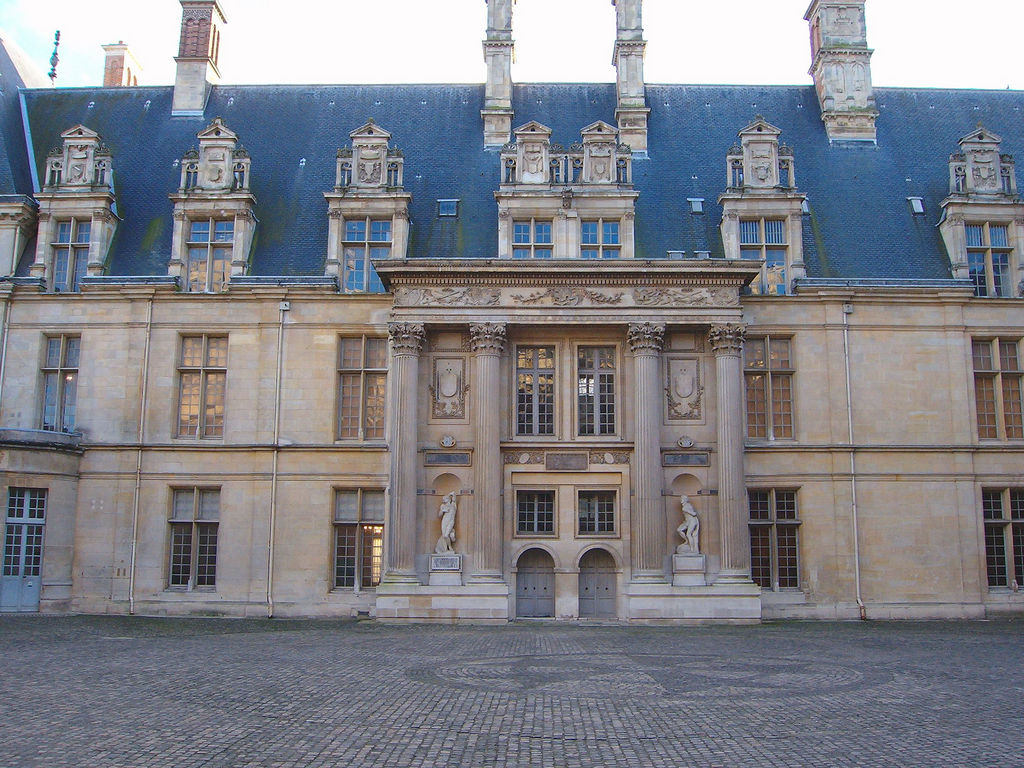
Courtyard entrance to the south wing, attributed to Jean Bullant, a very early use of the Colossal order of columns in Renaissance architecture, with niches for Michelangelo's statues, "The Slaves".

== The entrance wing and the courtyard ==
The present neoclassical entrance wing is a late addition, constructed after Louis Joseph, Prince of Condé, decided in 1787 to demolish the original gateway, which was surmounted by a statue of Montmorency, in order to have a better view of the garden. The new neoclassical entrance wing was completed in 1807 by the architect Antoine-François Peyre.

The central courtyard received major additions during the reign of Henry II of France. These included two new peristyles on the interior of the north and south wings, by Jean Bullant, installed to rebalance the facades after the enlargement of the stairway to the royal apartment in the north wing. These new peristyles were early examples of French Renaissance architecture, influenced by the Italian work of Bramante, and decorated with classical orders of columns and niches for statuary. The entrance to the stairway to the King's apartments was originally flanked by two statues by Michelangelo, The Slaves, which were gifts to Montmorency from Henry II. The originals are now in the Louvre Museum. The entrance to the apartments of the King and Queen is decorated with the crescent emblem of Henry II and the rainbow emblem of Catherine de Medicis.

Bullant is also credited with designing the central peristyle on the exterior of the North Wing, which covers the loggias of the monumental stairway. It has a classical pediment, large windows, orders of columns, and horizontal bands of sculptural decoration.

== Interior decoration ==
Much of the original decoration has disappeared, but some striking examples remain in the state rooms on the first floor, particularly the cabinet of the apartments of the King in the north wing and the library of the Constable, located over the chapel. These decorations include painted fireplaces that date to the reign of Henri II, featuring Biblical or historic scenes surrounded by mythical characters and animals, and cascades of fruit and vegetables. Notable examples are the fireplace in the Hall of Arms, illustrating the story of Solomon and Sheba, and the chimney of the Salle des cuirs des Héroes romaines, which illustrates the Tribute to Caesar. Other walls have frescoes of polychrome designs based on the constable's coats of arms. These heraldic designs, in color, highlight the more sober grisaille patterns of the stained glass windows, which are also from the reign of Henri II.

Some of the state rooms have sections of their original tile floors, made of polychrome faience tiles by Masséot Abaquesne. Some rooms, particularly the cabinet in the rooms of the King and the library, over the chapel, also have some of their original carved wood panelling, featuring the emblem of Montmorency intertwined with Moorish and arabesque designs.

=== The Constable's apartments and Chapel ===
The chapel, on the ground floor of the south wing, was stripped of its furnishings during the French Revolution. The original stained glass windows and wood paneling are now in the Château de Chantilly. The chapel retains the ceiling of arched rib vaults decorated with the painted coats-of-arms of Montmorency and his wife, Madeleine of Savoy. The chapel has a very early copy of the Last Supper by Leonardo da Vinci, painted in Milan between 1506 and 1509 by Marco d'Oggiono, a pupil of da Vinci. It hung in the chapel during the time of Montmorency.

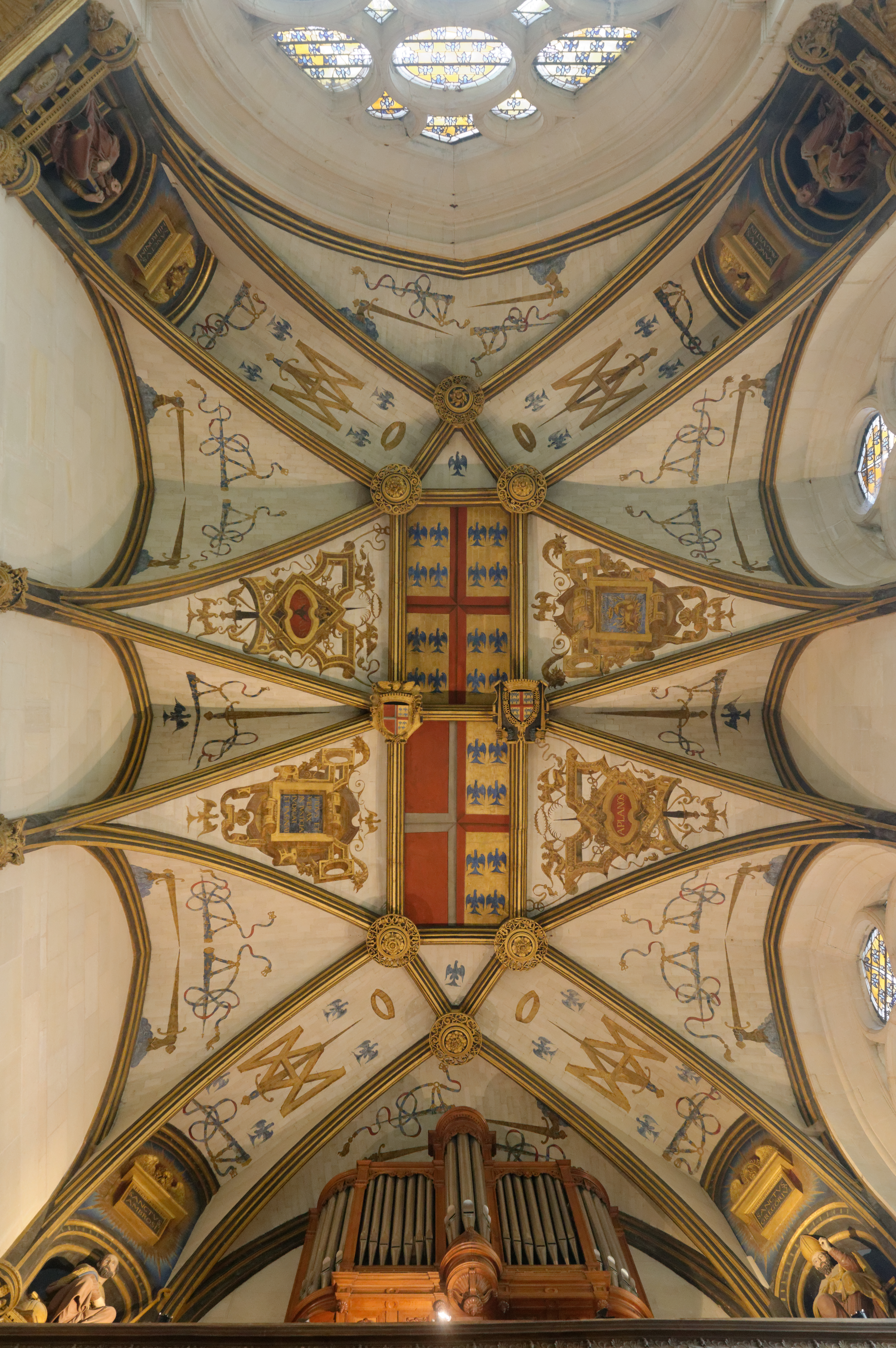
Ceiling of the Chapel, with the coats-of-arms of Montmorency and Madeleine of Savoy

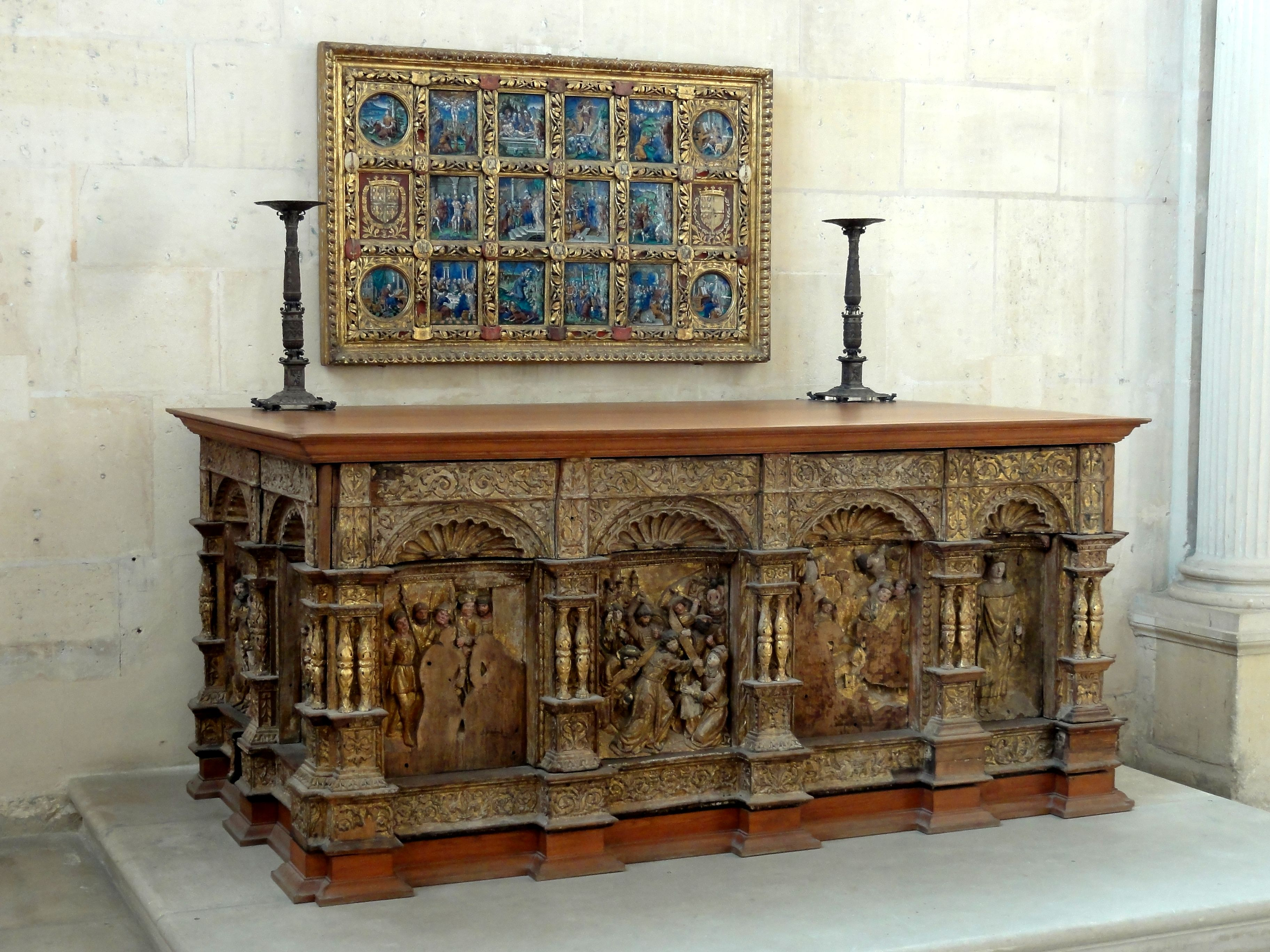
Chapel altarpiece of gilded carved wood and panel of painted enamel biblical scenes by Léonard Limosin

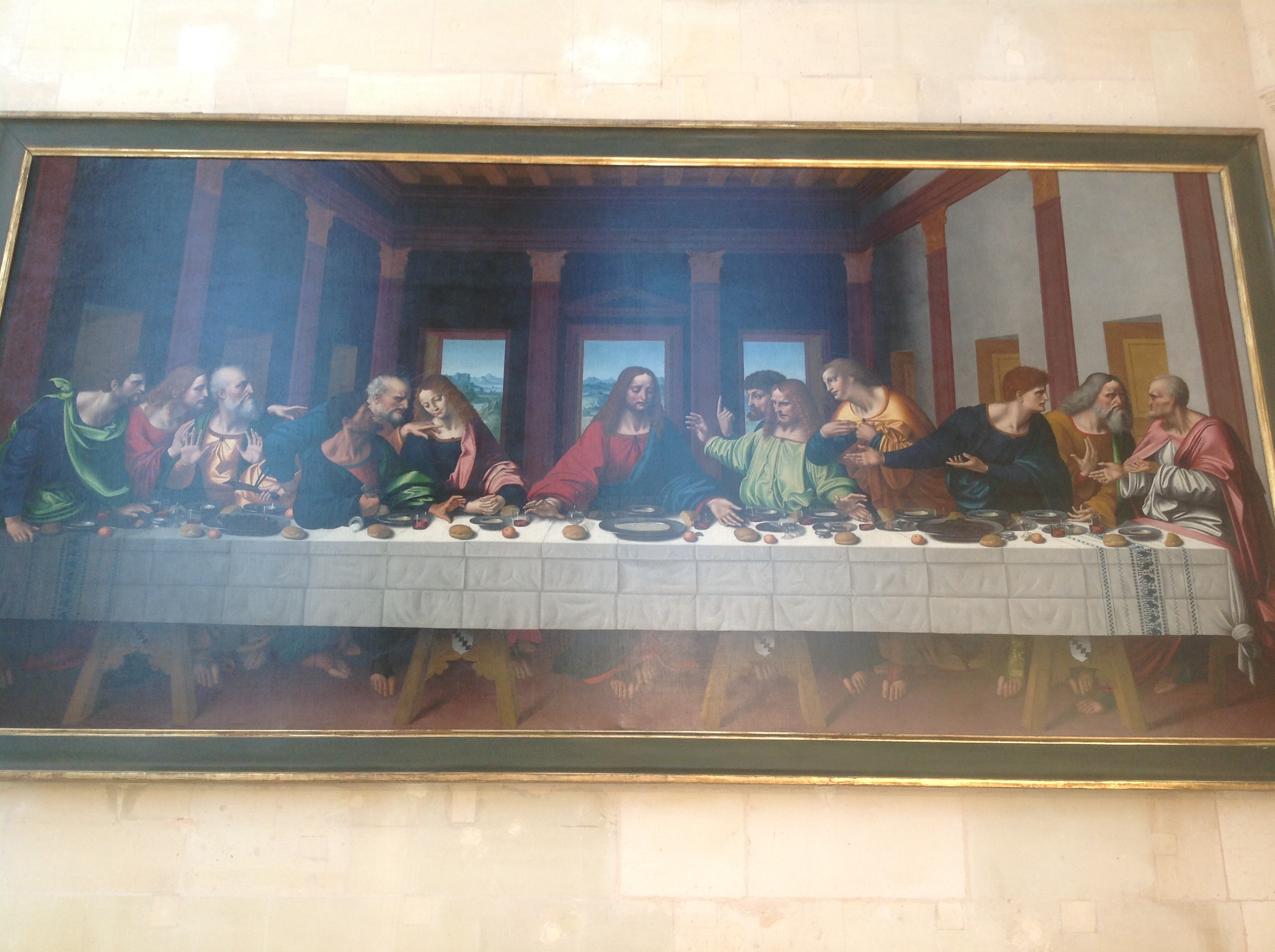
Copy of Last Supper made by Marco Oggiono, pupil of DaVinci (1506-1509). It hung in the chapel in the time of Montmorency

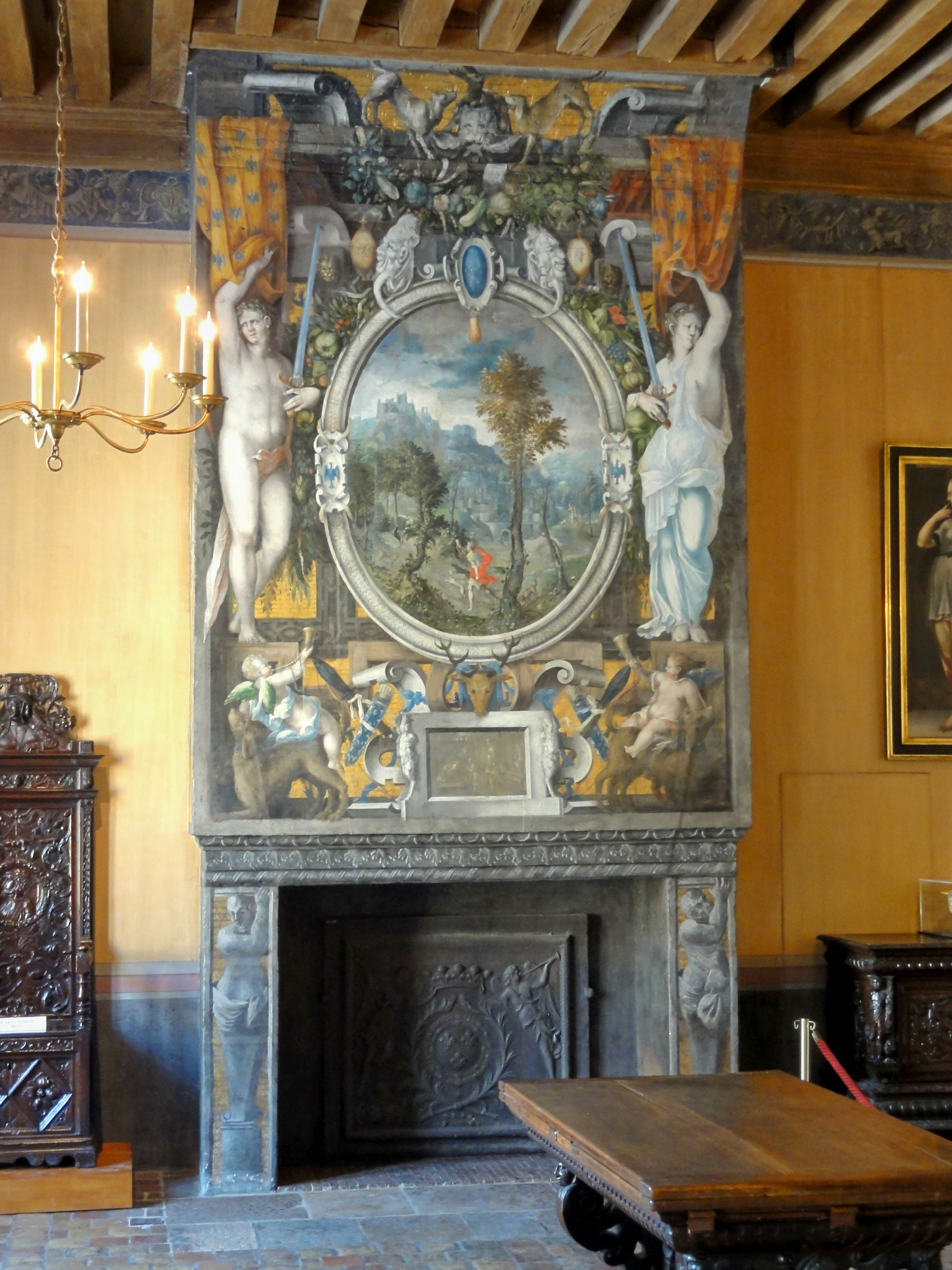
Fireplace in the Hall of Arms of the Constable, Solomon and the Queen of Sheba (about 1550)

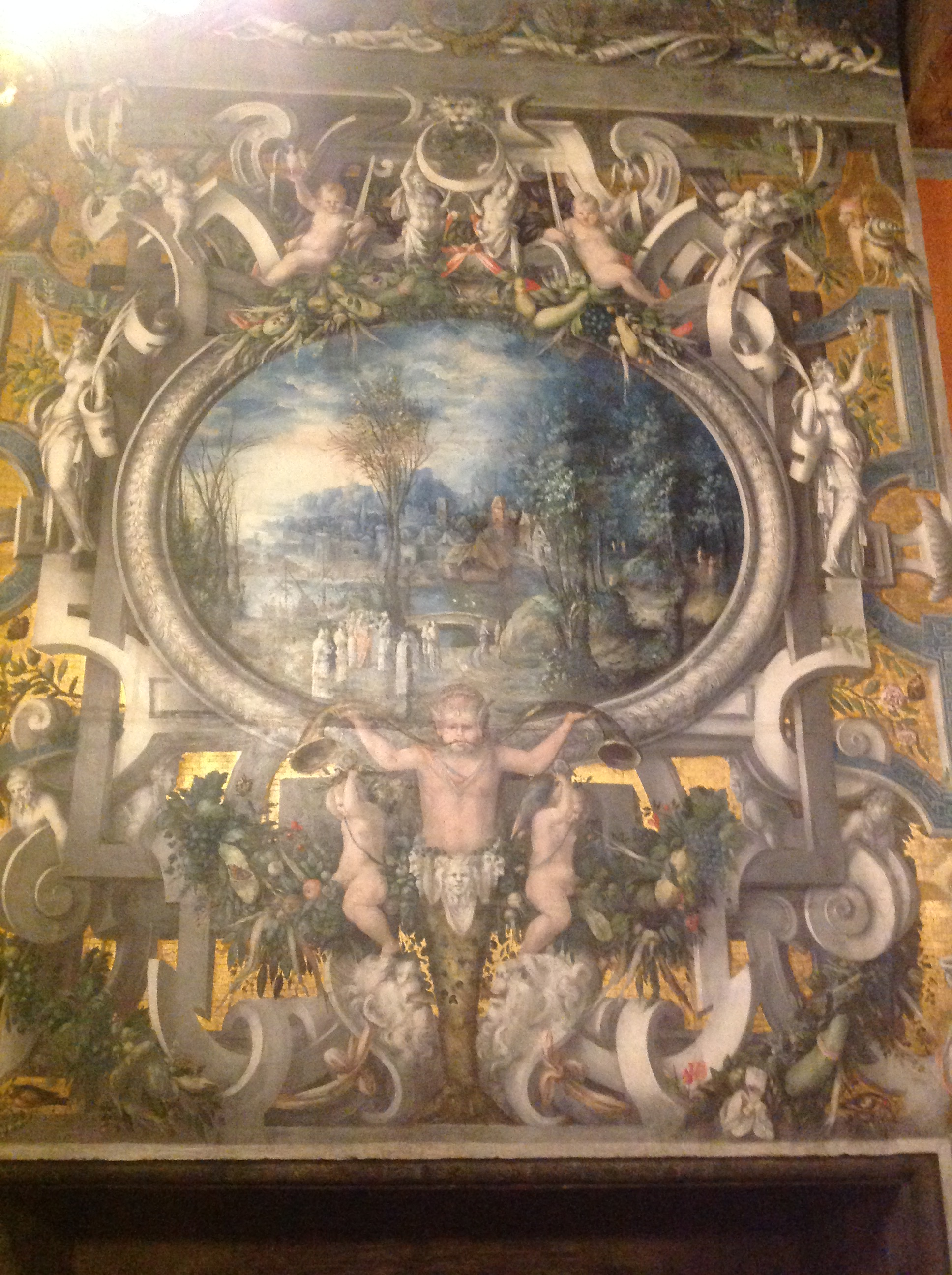
Tribute to Caesar fireplace, Salles des cuirs des Heros romains, (about 1550)

=== Apartments of the King and Queen ===
Traces of the original decoration are found in the apartments of the King and Queen. The King's bedchamber still has some of the original painted monograms of Henry II, a crescent moon, on the ceiling. The painted fireplace in his bedchamber shows a biblical scene, beneath his coat of arms held by two cherubs. His bedchamber also has two tapestries from the series called David and Bathsheba.

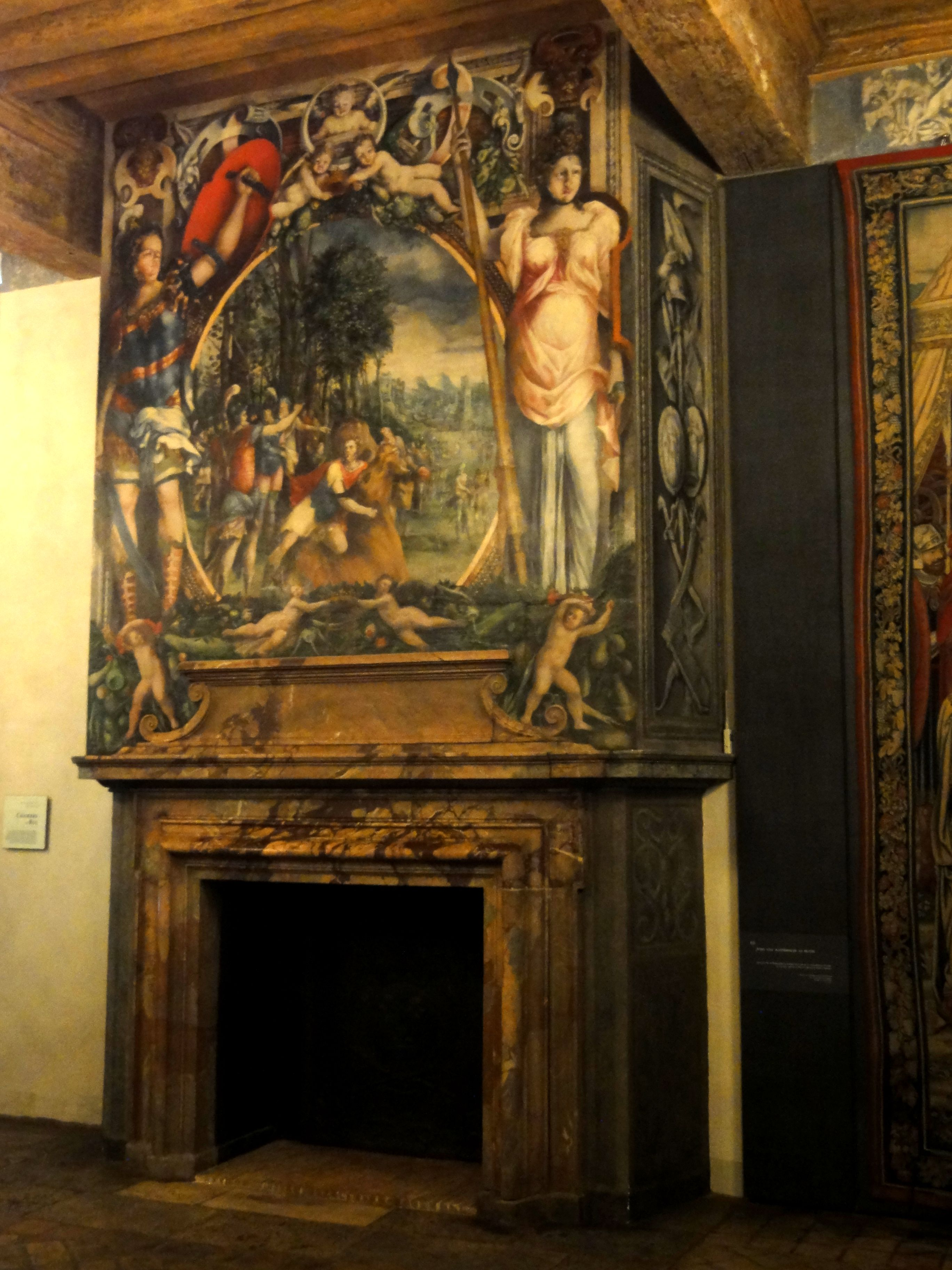
Fireplace in the bedchamber of the King, with a Biblical scene and the coat of arms of Henry II of France

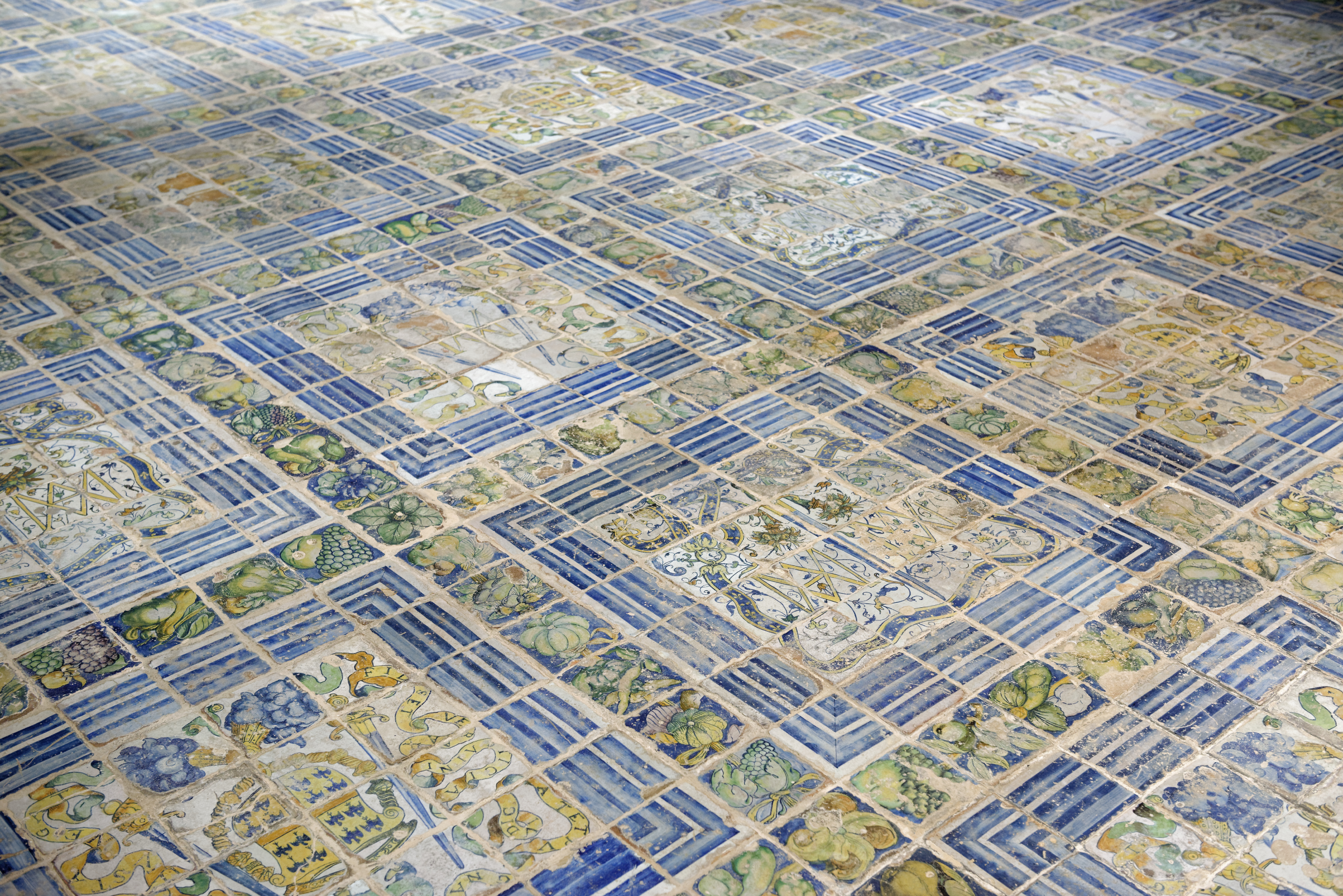
Polychrome ceramic floor tiles by Masséot Abaquesne in the royal apartments

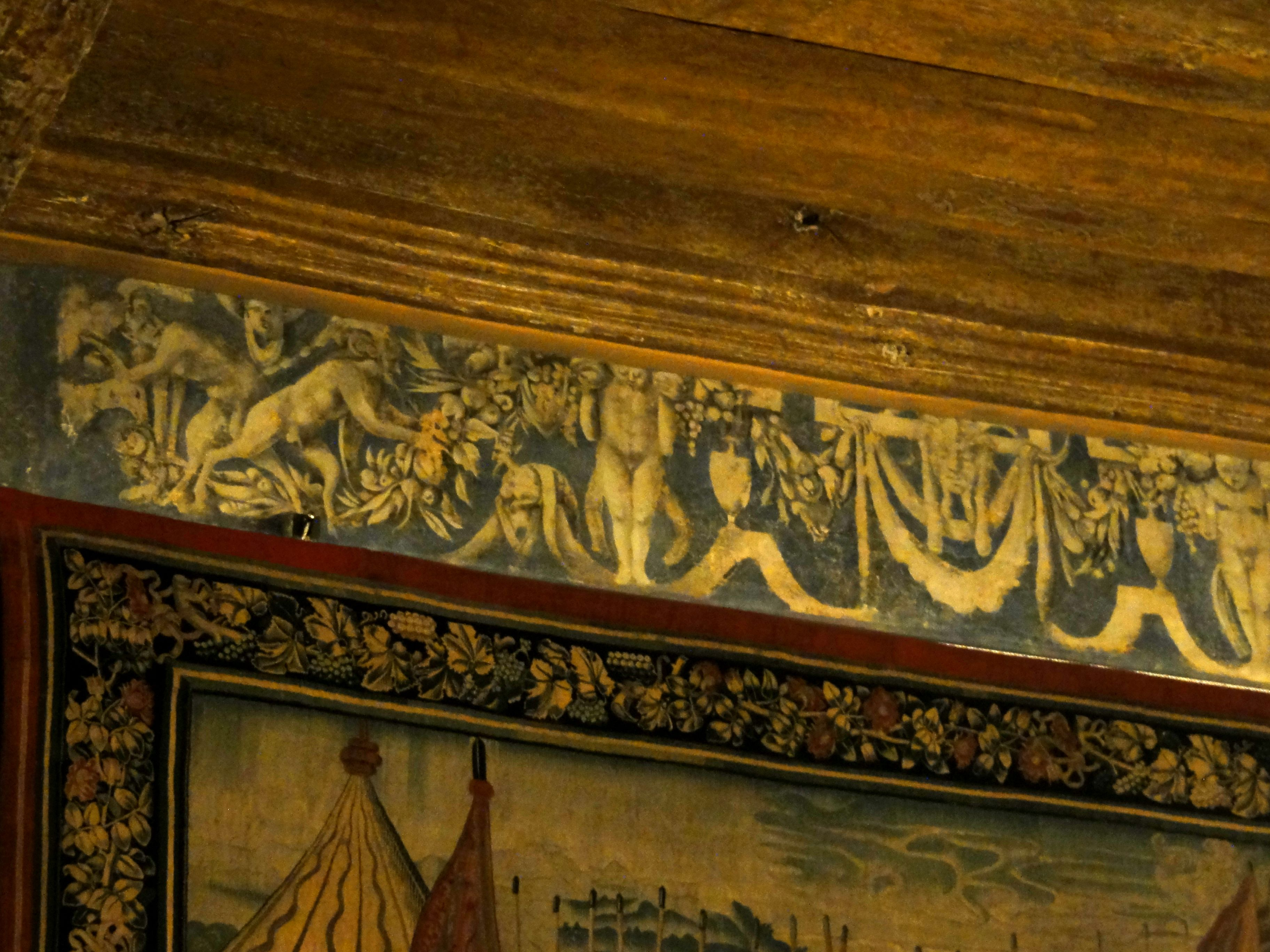
Painted frieze in the bedroom of the King

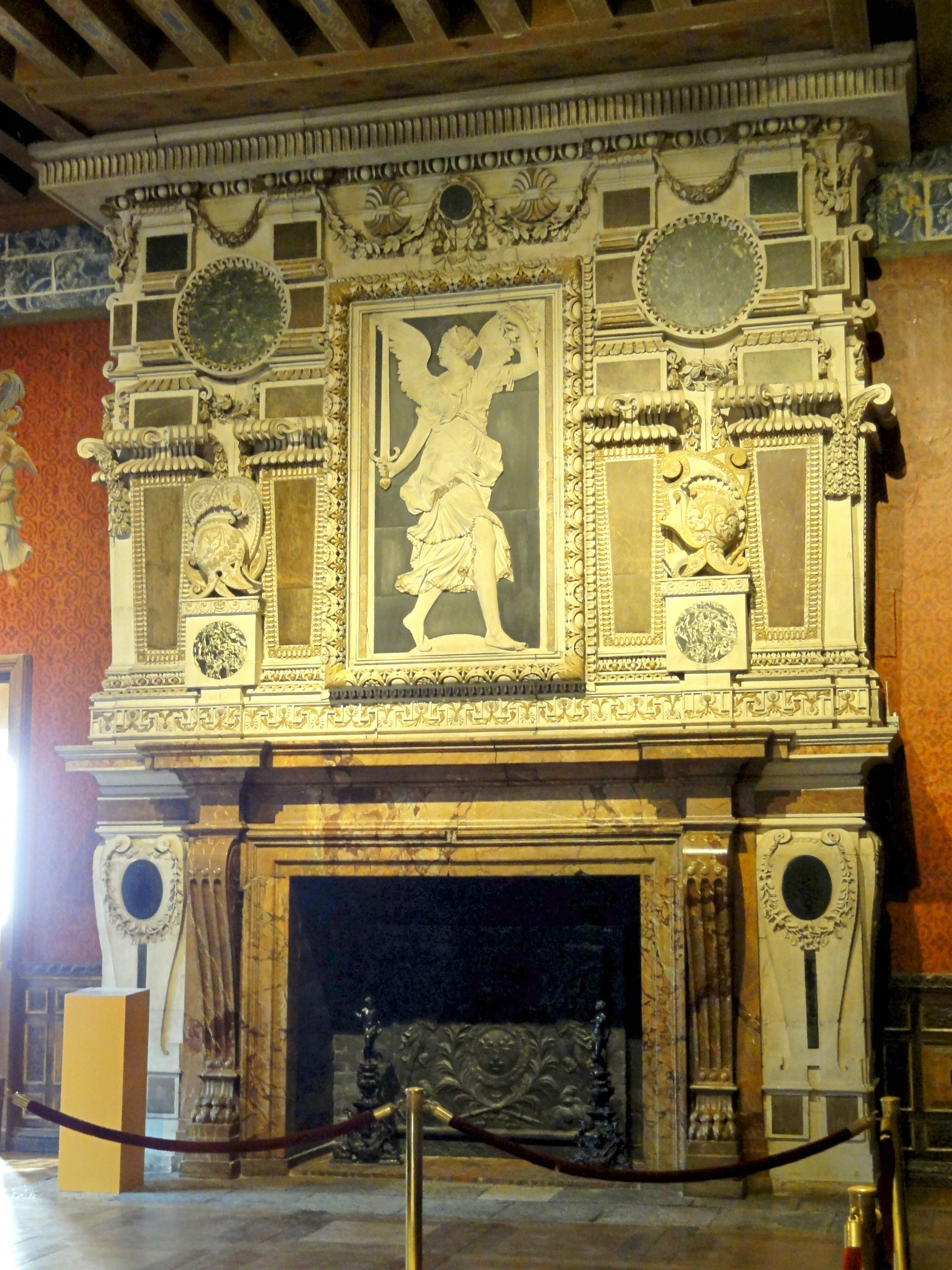
Fireplace in the Great Hall of the King

== Collections of the Museum of the Renaissance ==
The museum collections have a history of their own, separate from the château. The first collections were originally acquired by the French state in 1843 from Alexandre Du Sommerard (1779–1842), Counselor and Master of the Cour-des Comptes, who assembled a very large collection of objects from Antiquity until the French Renaissance. After his death, these became the heart of the collection of the new Cluny Museum in Paris. Under the supervision of the museum's new curator, Edmond Du Sommerard, Alexandre's son, many other objects were donated or purchased, until the collection was much too large to display adequately.

The Cluny Museum re-opened after the German occupation in World War II, and a long debate began on where to put the Renaissance Art. This was not settled until 1969, when the culture minister, André Malraux, proposed opening a new museum in the Château d'Écouen. The château, which had been stripped of almost all art, was renovated by architects of the Monument historiques.

The new collection was chosen from among the objects of the Cluny collection based on chronology and style. The Ecouen museum received Italian Renaissance works created after 1400 and other works after 1500. The new museum also received two important works from the Louvre Museum, The Last Supper by Marco d'Oggiono and the Retable of the Passion by Pierre Raymond. The first galleries of the new museum opened in October 1977. A number of rooms have been furnished with objects suitable for the use of different historical figures from the history of the château. A series of small, focussed exhibitions have been staged at Écouen over the years since the museum opened completely in 1982.

=== Stained glass ===
Most of the original stained glass of the château was removed in the 18th and 19th centuries (some is now in the Château de Chantilly), but the museum displays some remarkable glass from other sites. Many of the windows have emblems of the king or constable or other personalities in colored glass, in the middle of windows which are largely clear or in muted colors. Other windows use a full range of rich colors.

Among the notable works in the collection is a portrait of King Francis I of France in prayer, by Nicolas Beaurain, made in about 1551-1556. It was commissioned by Henry II of France in 1549 to decorate Sainte-Chapelle de Vincennes for the ceremonies of the Order of Saint-Michel, an order he founded. Most of the stained glass windows in the chapel were destroyed during the French Revolution, but this portion survived. It is notable especially for fine detail and shading of the colors, especially in the figure and costume of the king.

Another significant work in the collection is a stained-glass depiction of a scene from the life of Saint Paul, showing Saint Paul being chased from the Temple in Jerusalem. It is one of two scenes by Louis Pinaigrier and Nicolas Charnus (first third of the 17th century). It was formerly in Paris, in the Church of Saint-Paul, which was destroyed in 1797, not long after the French Revolution.

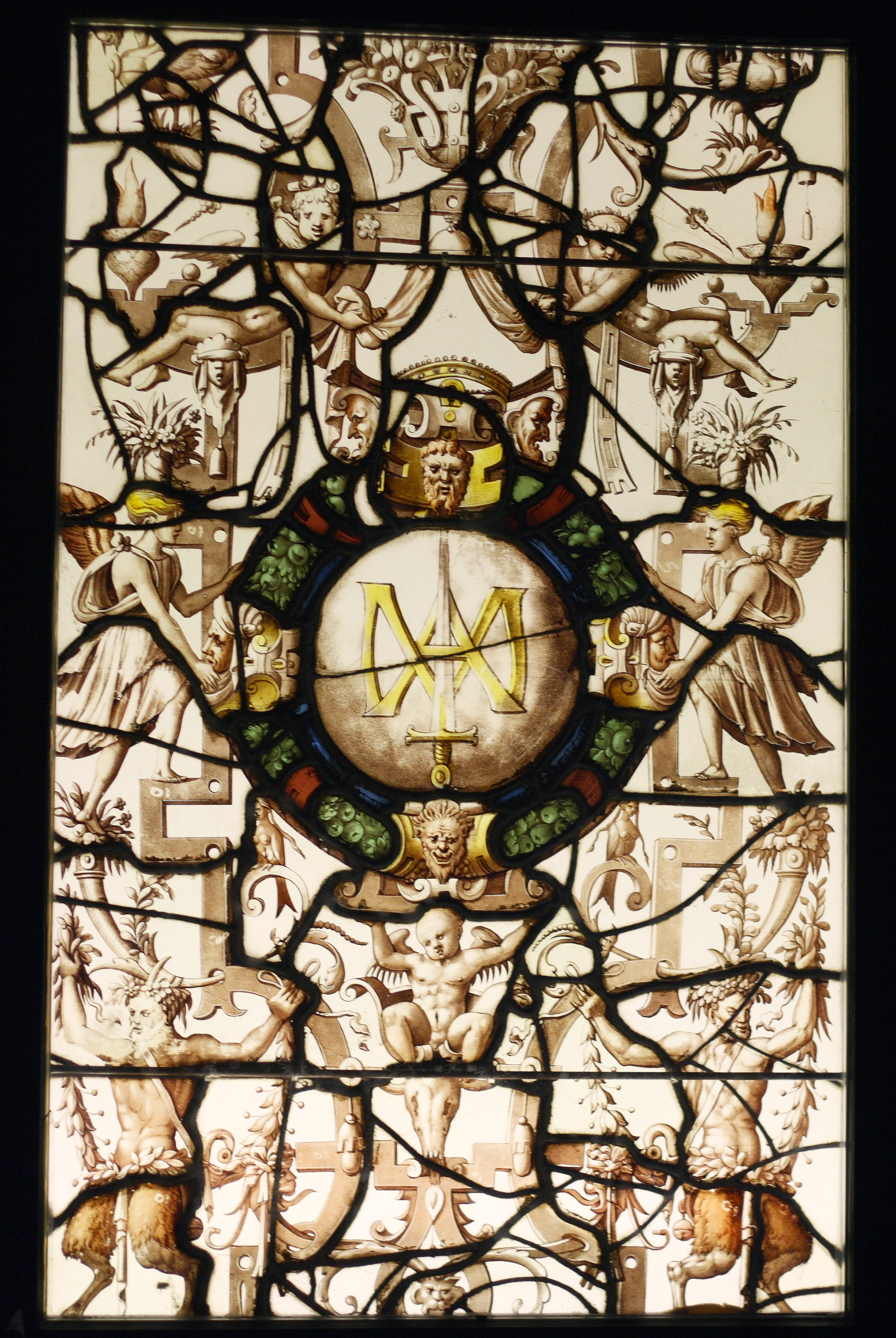
Window with emblem of Montmorency in center

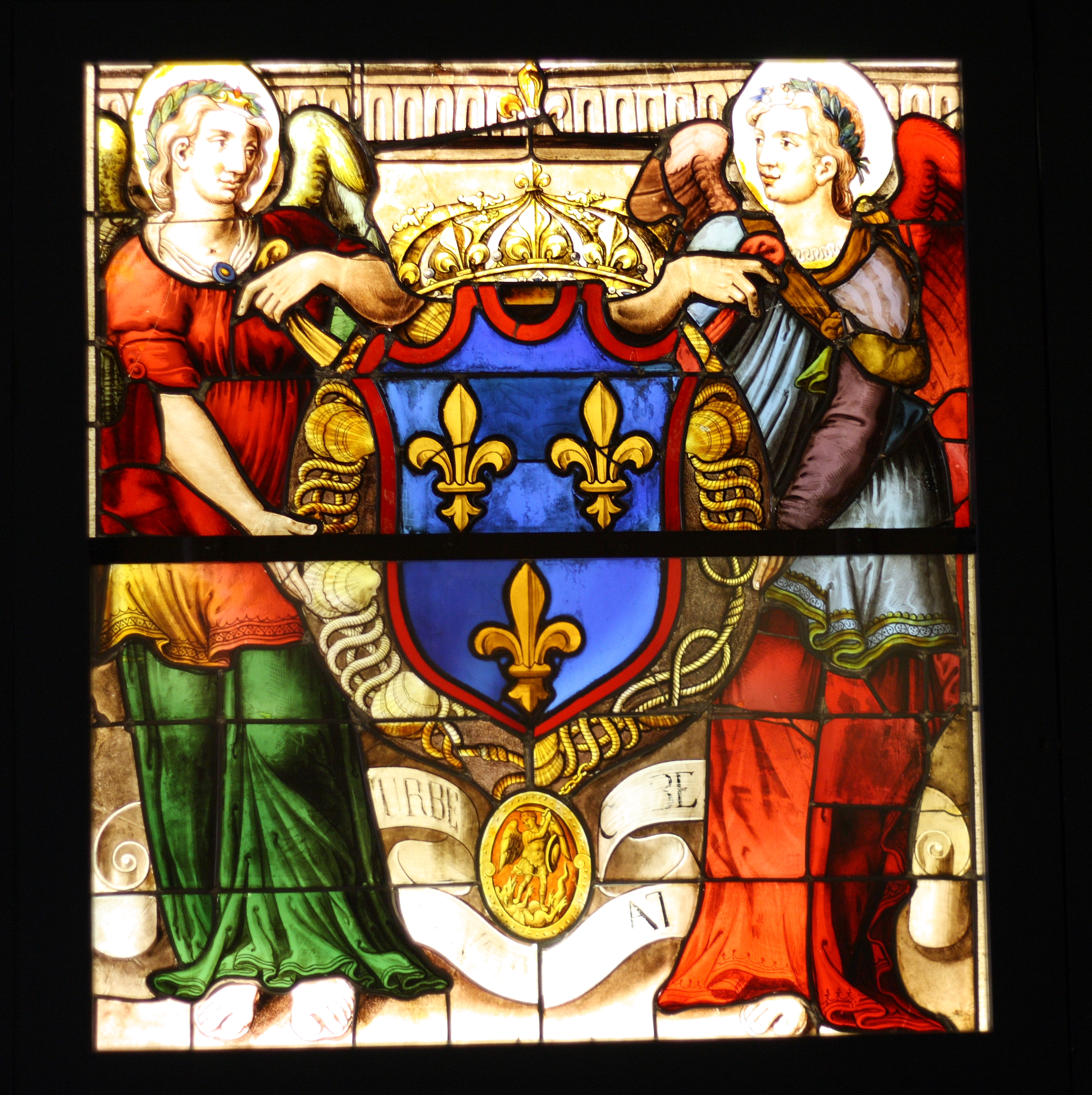
Coat of arms with angels, originally in the windows of the Saint-Chapelle chapel in Vincennes

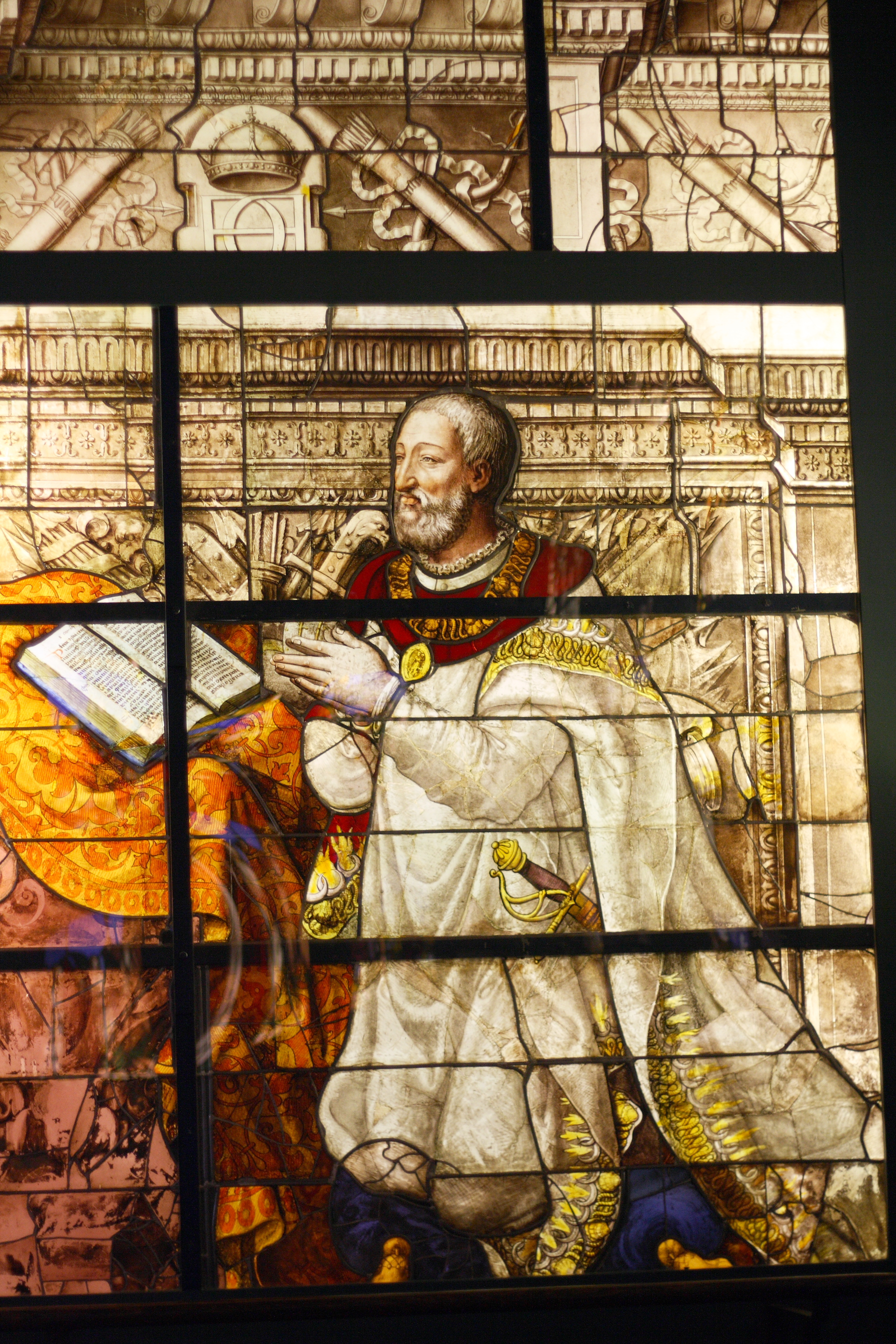
Posthumous portrait of Francis I of France in prayer by Nicolas Beaurain (1551-1556)

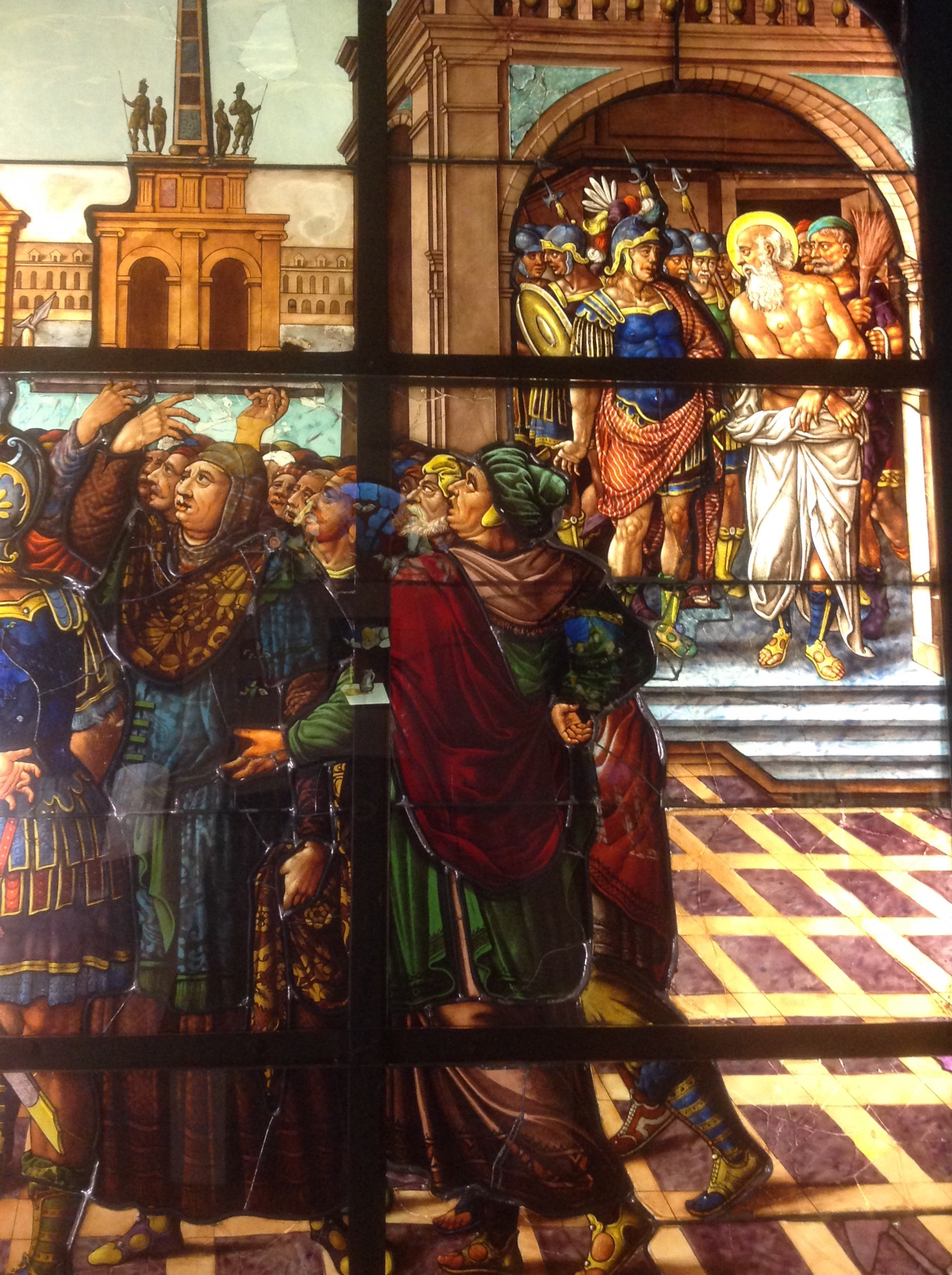
Arrest of Saint Paul in Jerusalem, by Louis Pinaigrier and Nicolas Charnus, (last third of 17th century)

=== Tapestries ===
The collection of tapestries includes ten tapestries from the series David and Bathsheba, made in Brussels in 1520-1525 after designs by Jan Van Roome. Together, they measure seventy-five meters in length. They depict the Biblical story, but the costumes and settings are of the 16th century, and the tapestries give a detailed view of court life at the time. The identity of the original patron is not known, but Henry VIII of England purchased them in 1528.

Other notable tapestries include Fructus Belli (Fruits of War), from the workshop of Jehan Baudouin in Brussels, after a design by Giulio Romano. It was commissioned in 1544 by Ferrante Gonzaga, the Duke of Guastalla and chief of the armies of the Emperor Charles V of Austria, and depicts soldiers being paid. It shows the growing influence of Italian art on Flemish tapestries.

Italian tapestries are also represented, including "The life of a man" by Benedetto Squilli of Florence, after a painting by Jan Van der Straet. It was originally made for the Medici family for the Palazzo Vecchio in Florence, as part of cycle conceived by Georgio Vasari.

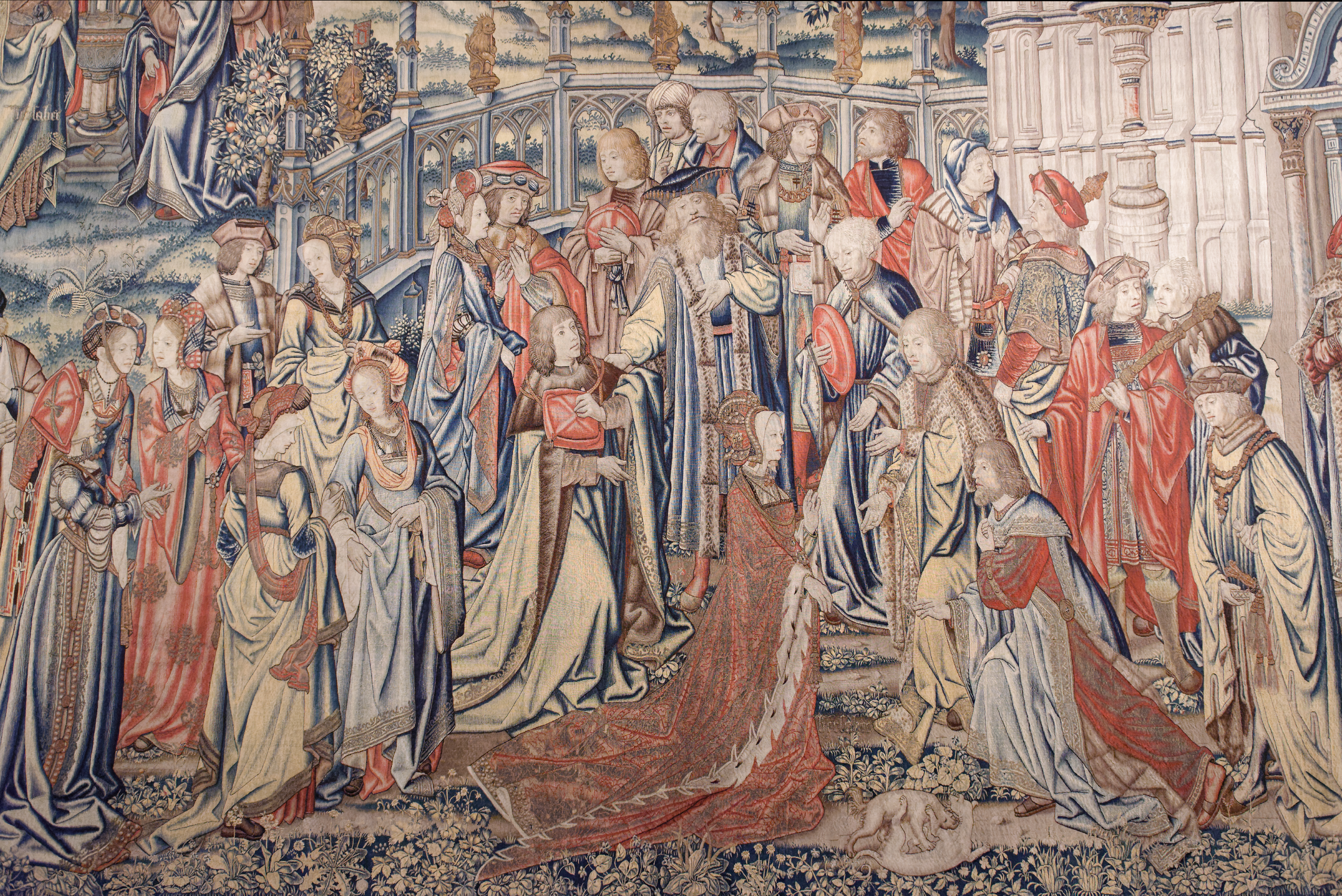
Bathsheba at the Fountain from the series David and Bathsheba (1520-1525)

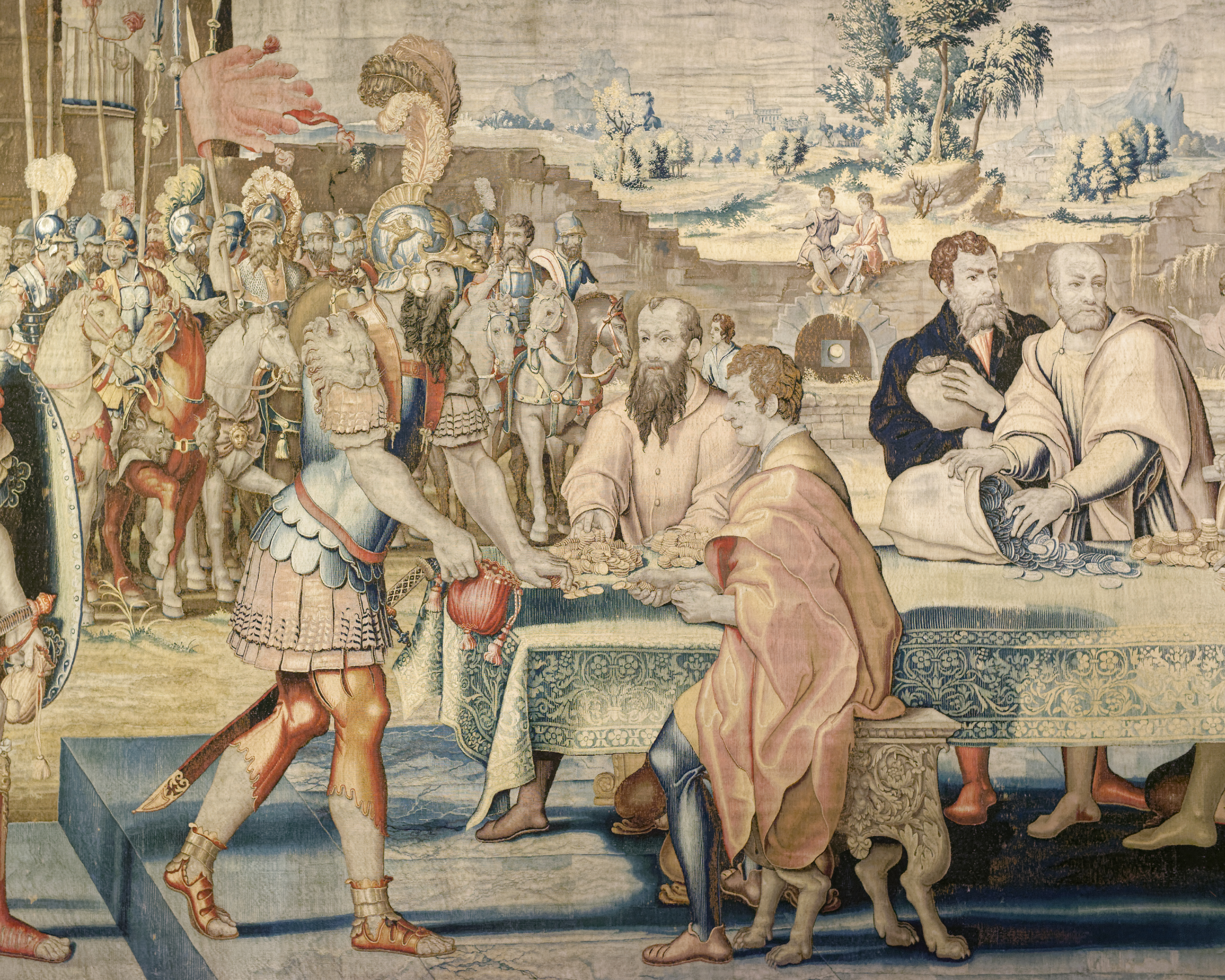
Detail of the Fructus Belli (Fruits of War) tapestry, in the Great Hall of the King (1544)

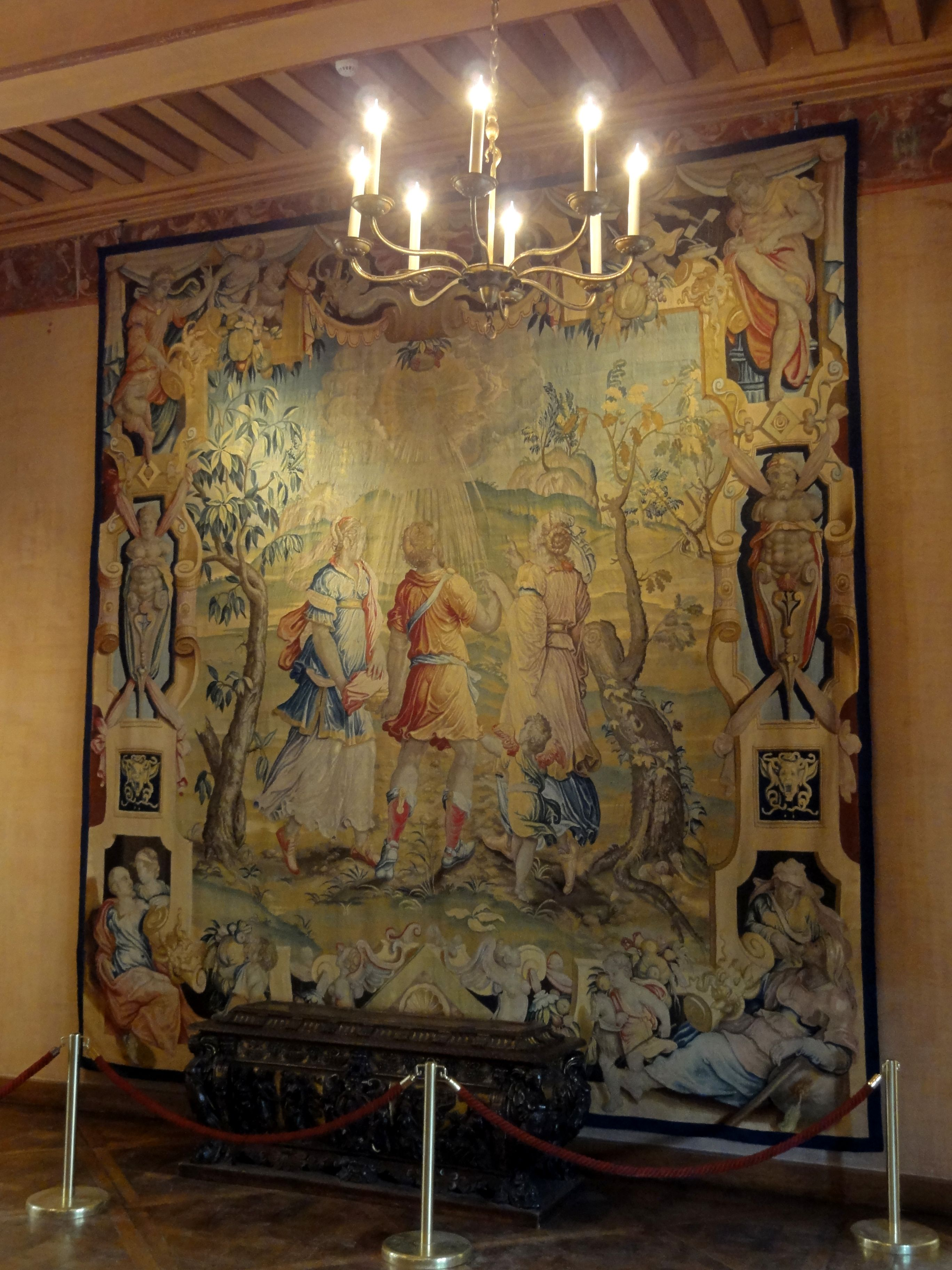
Scene from The Life of a Man, workshop of Benedetto Squilli, Florence (about 1564)

=== Paintings ===
The collection of paintings includes work by Toussaint Dubreuil (c. 1561—22 November 1602) a French Mannerist painter associated (from 1594) with the second School of Fontainebleau (together with the artists Martin Fréminet and Ambroise Dubois) and Italianism, a transitional art style. Many of Dubreuil's subjects include mythological scenes and scenes from works of fiction by such writers as the Italian Torquato Tasso, the ancient Greek novelist Heliodorus of Emesa and the French poet Pierre de Ronsard.

One of the most notable paintings is the Voyage of Ulysses by the Italian Guidoccio Cozzarelli of Siena, from about 1480. Painted on a wood panel, it was originally attached to a large chest, and was intended to be placed in the bedroom of newlyweds, to remind the bride about the virtue of faithfulness. The painting, based on the Odyssey of Homer, depicts Ulysses' wife, Penelope, faithfully waiting for her husband's return from his twenty years of voyaging.

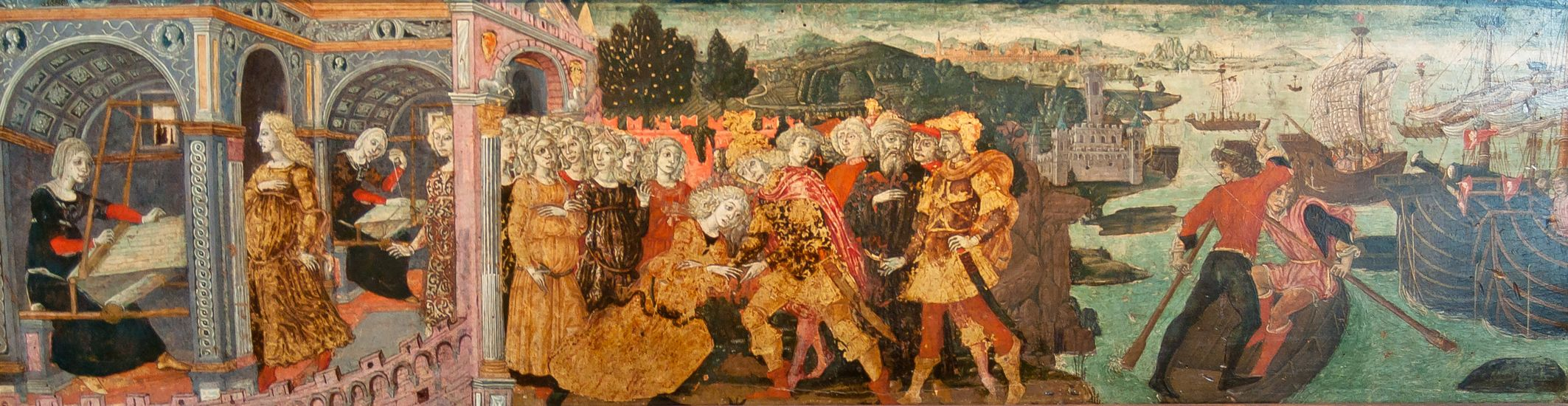
The Voyage of Ulysses, by Guidoccio Cozzarelli (about 1480)

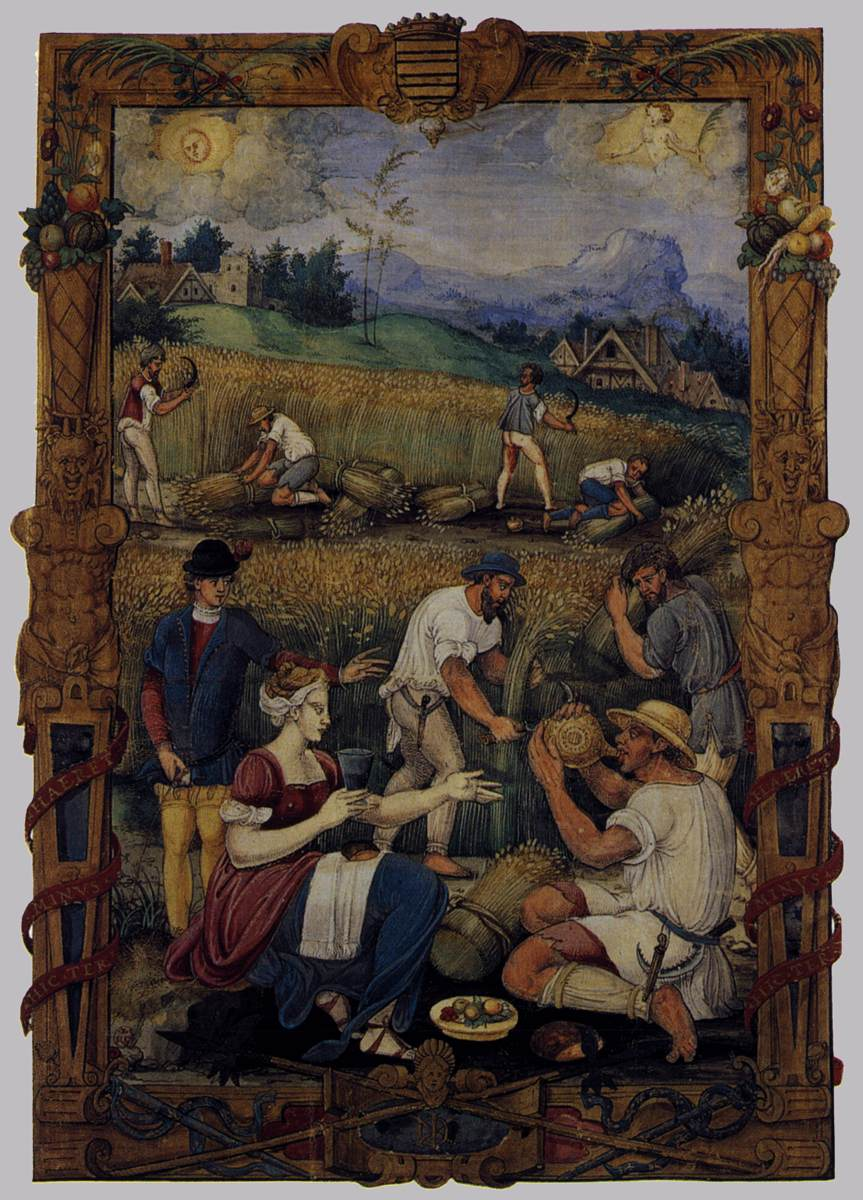
'August' - miniature from a Book of Hours (about 1520)

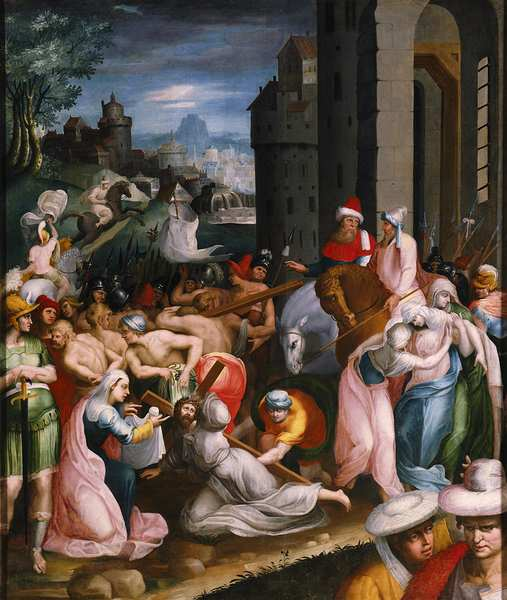
'The Ascent of Calvary by Toussaint Dubreuil (end of 16th century)

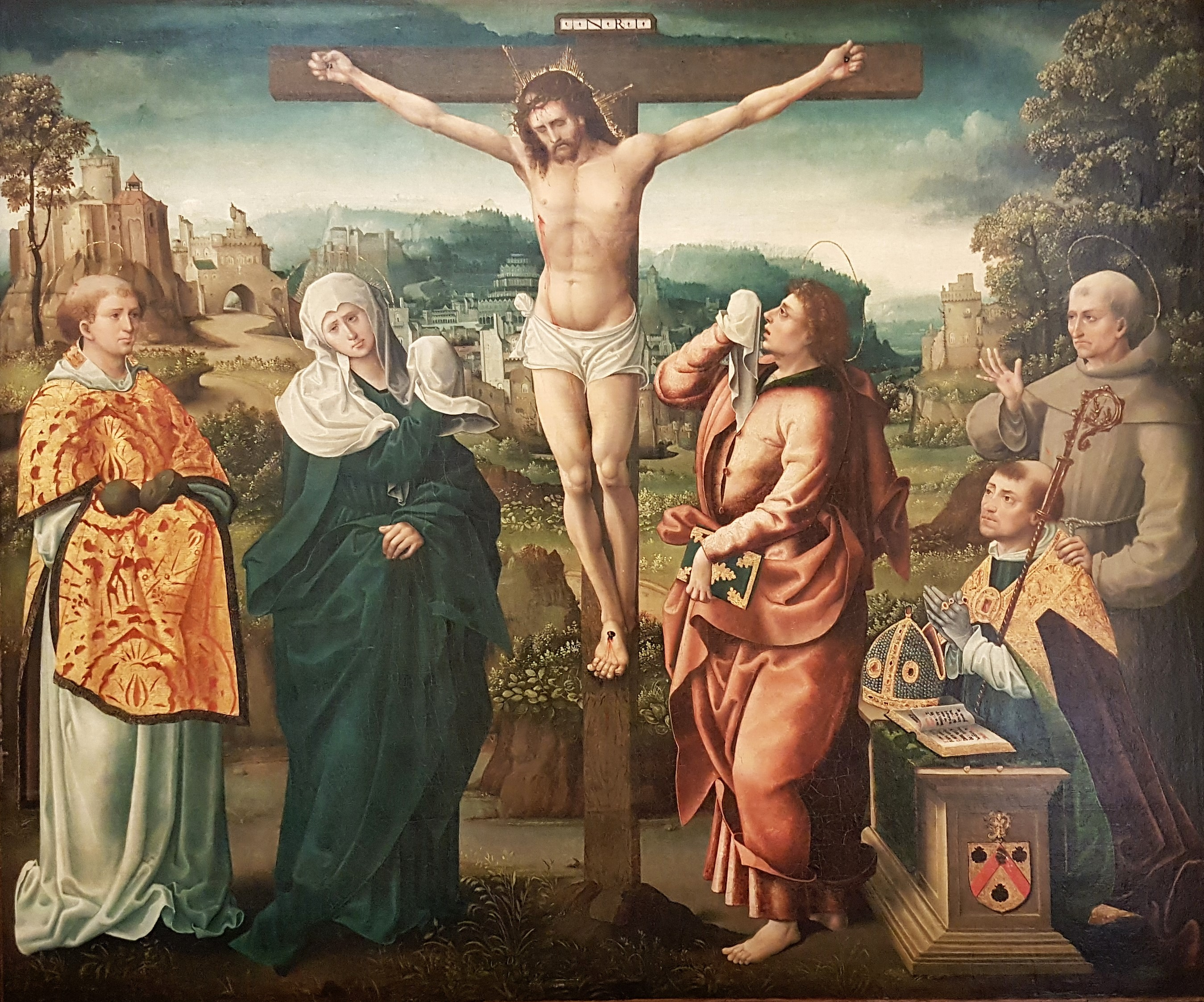
The Crucifixion by Noël Bellemare and workshop (about 1519-26). It depicts the Bishop of Paris, François Poncher, in prayer.

=== Furniture and paneling ===
The museum displays an important collection of carved wood furniture and panels, which illustrate the art of the French wood carving and decoration, as well as the influence of Italian artists working in France, particularly Rosso Fiorentino, responsible for much of the interior decoration of the Palace of Fontainebleau.

The works in the collection show the transition of furniture from the medieval period to the Renaissance, through with the addition of an abundance of carved ornaments in classical forms, such as medallions, grotesques and architectural orders, making pieces of furniture such as chests, dressers, tables and chairs into works of sculpture. Engravings of Italian paintings and sculpture often served as models. The collection also includes numerous panels which were preserved from works that were dismantled. The collection presents especially works from the regions of Ile-de-France, Lorraine, Champagne and Burgundy, which were heavily forested and had the workshops of numerous skilled artisans making both religious and civil furniture.

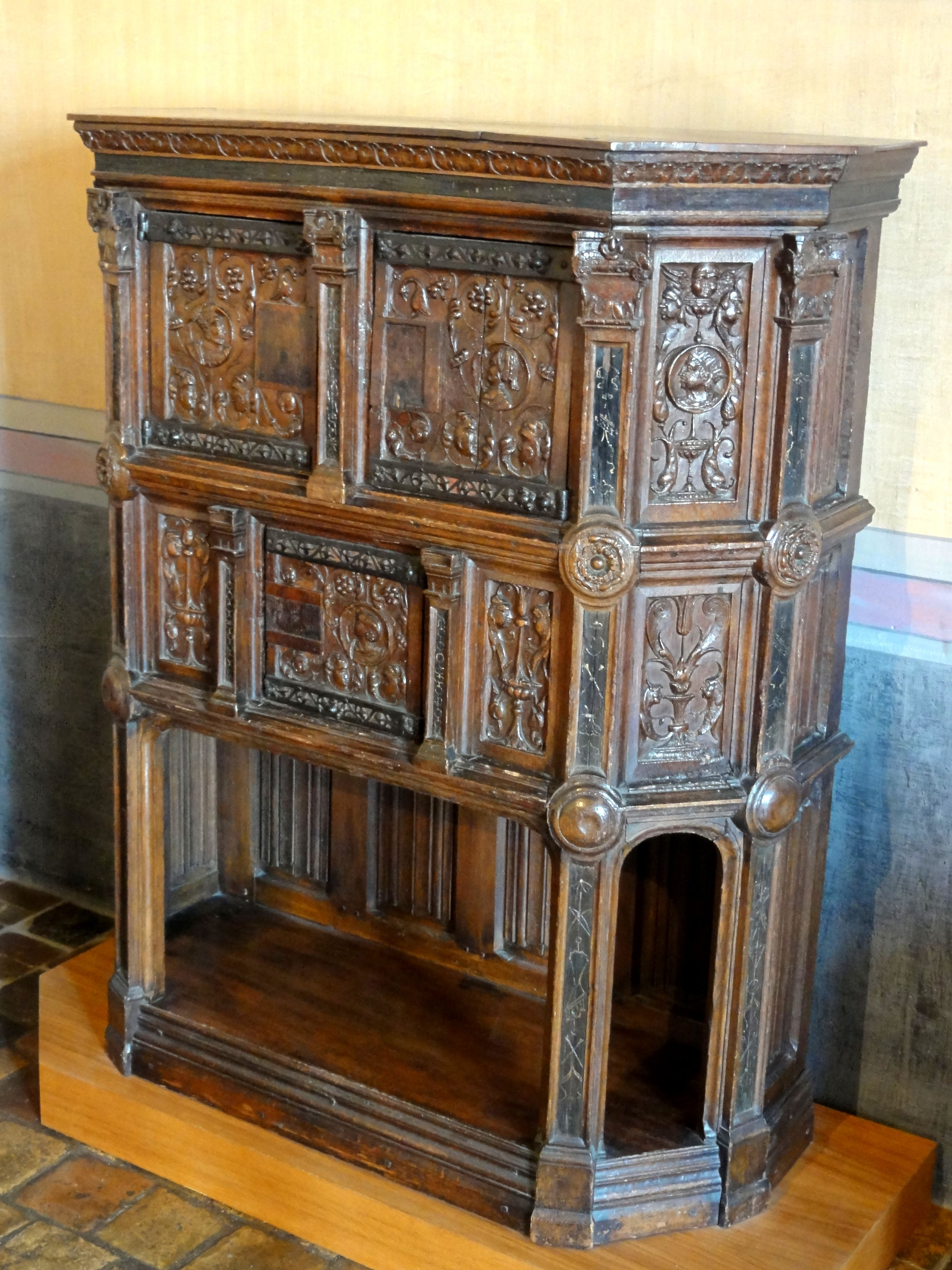
A dressoir from the Château of Joinville (1524), designed to hold formal table settings, with a combination of gothic and Renaissance ornament

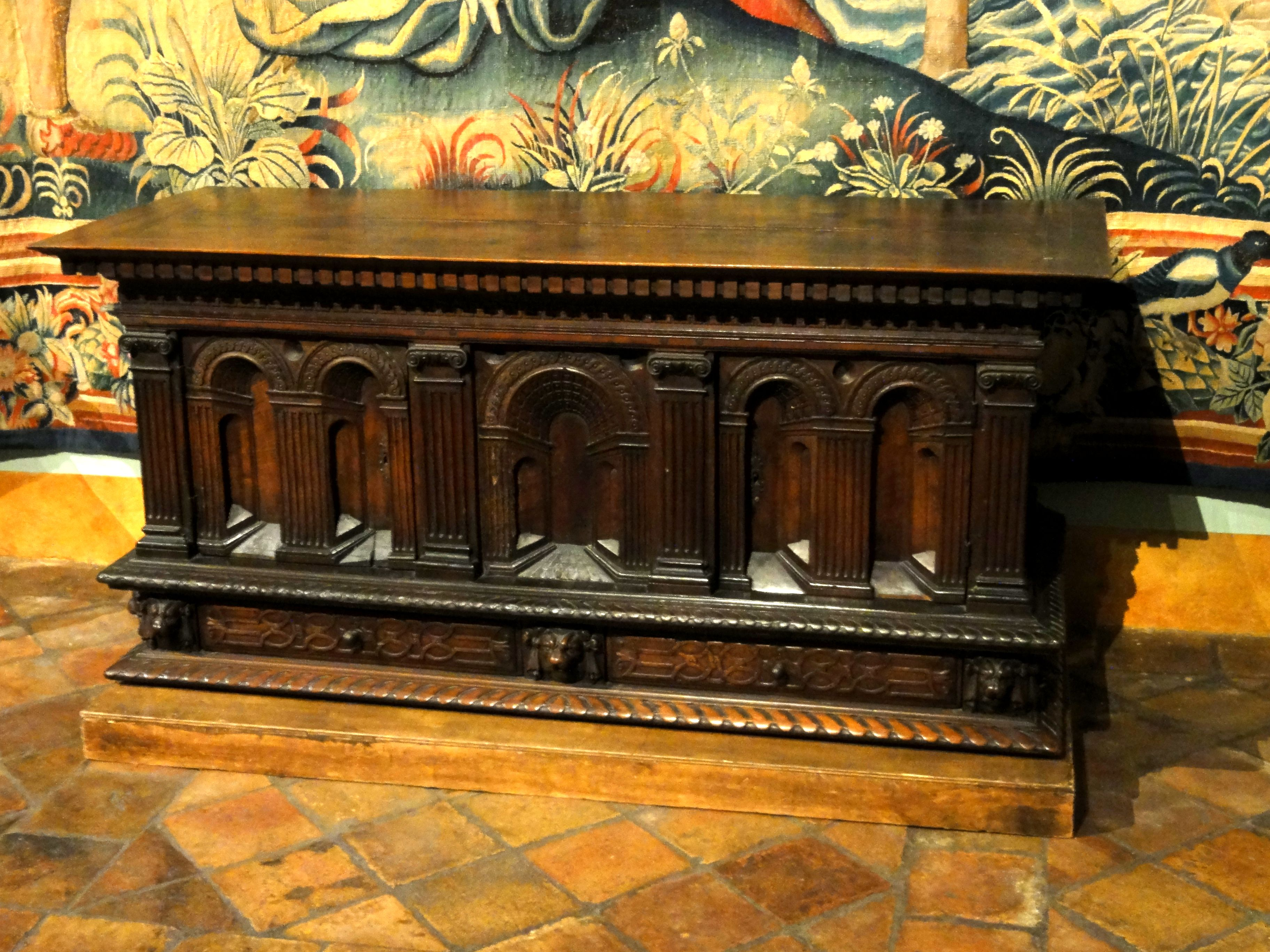
Carved chest in the bedroom of the Queen, with architectural decoration

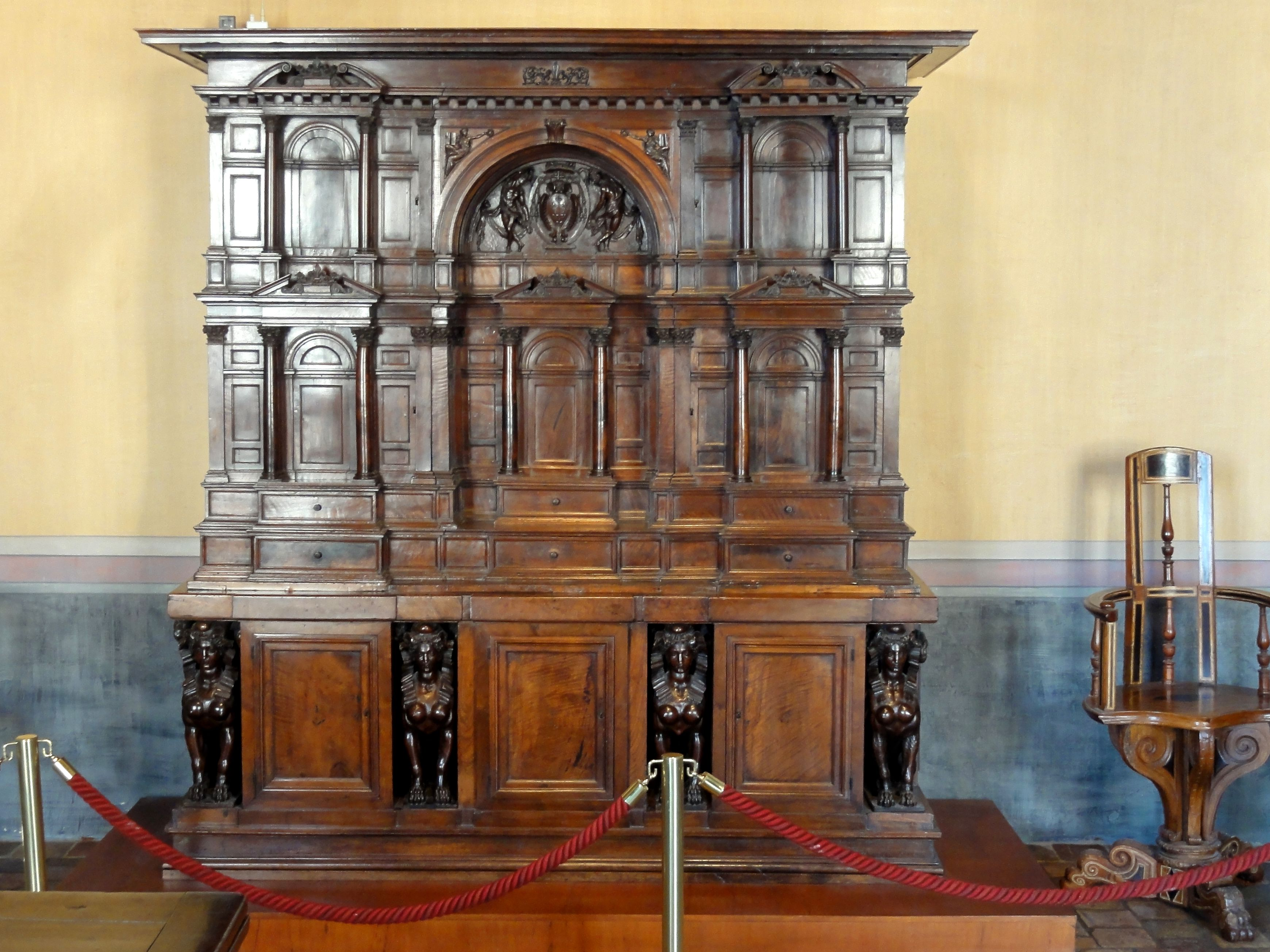
Dressoir in the apartment of the Grand Constable

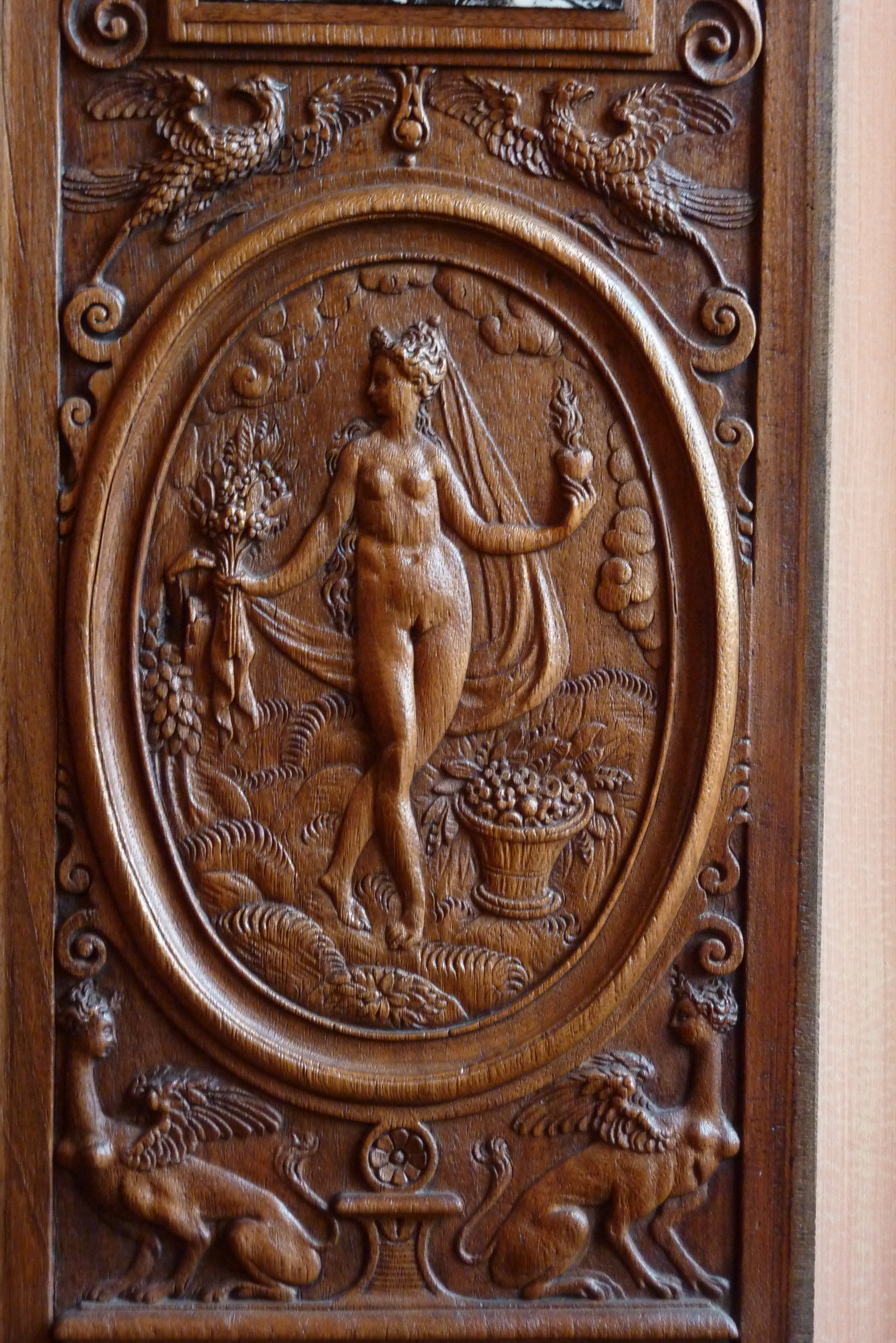
Carved paneling

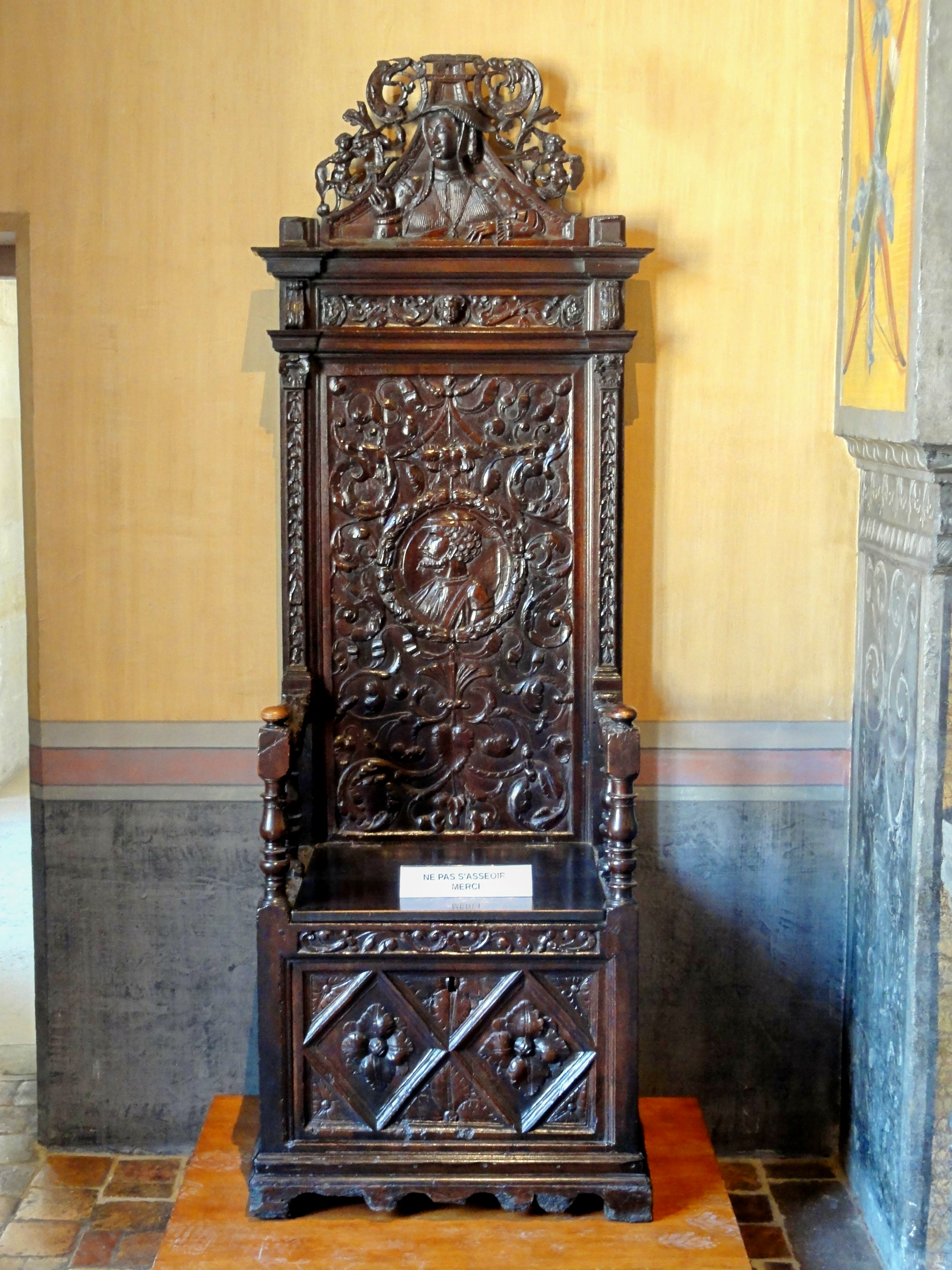
Carved chair, apartment of the Grand Constable

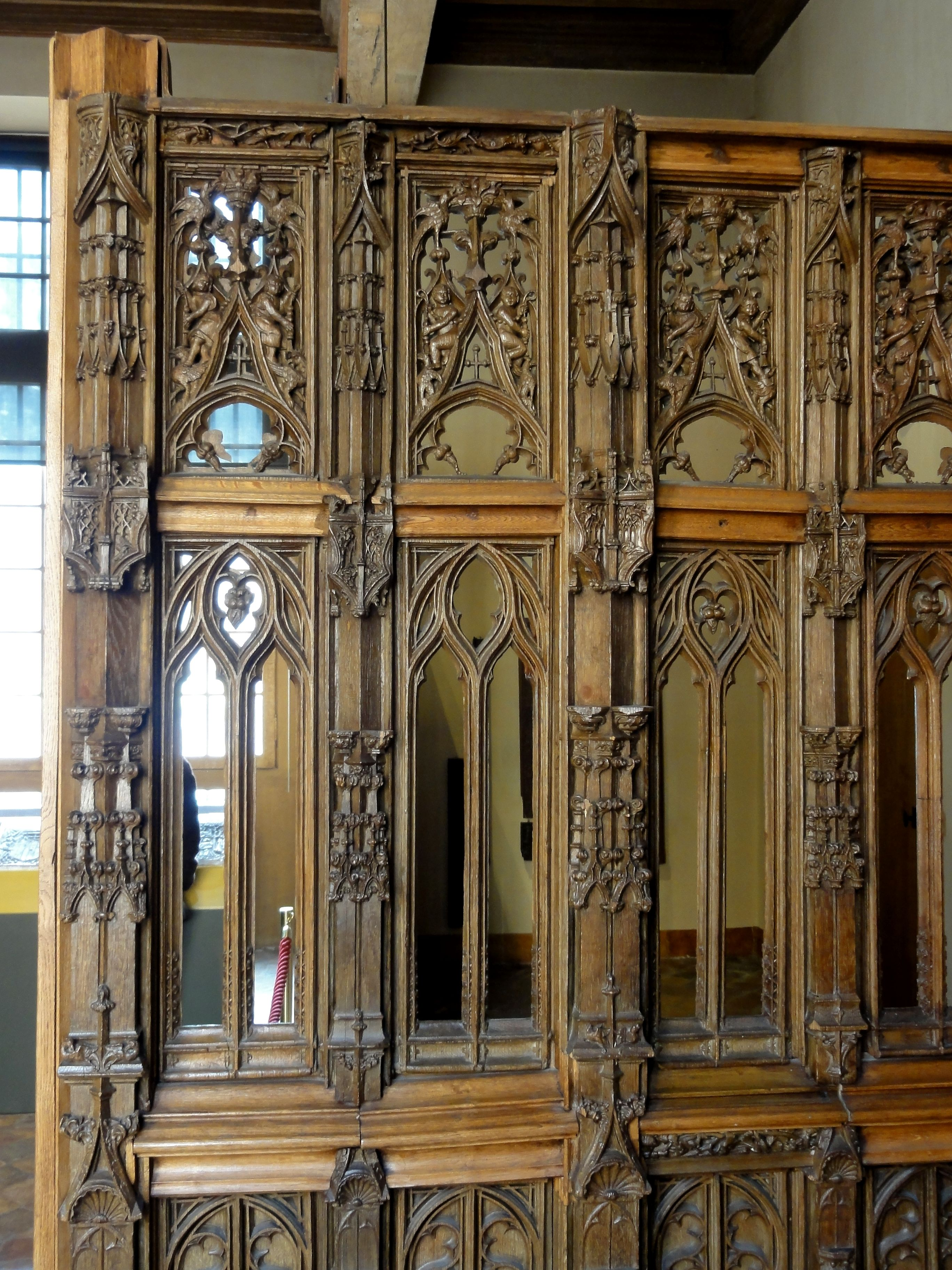
Carved screen from the choir of the chapel of the Château de Gaillon in Normandy

=== Ceramics ===
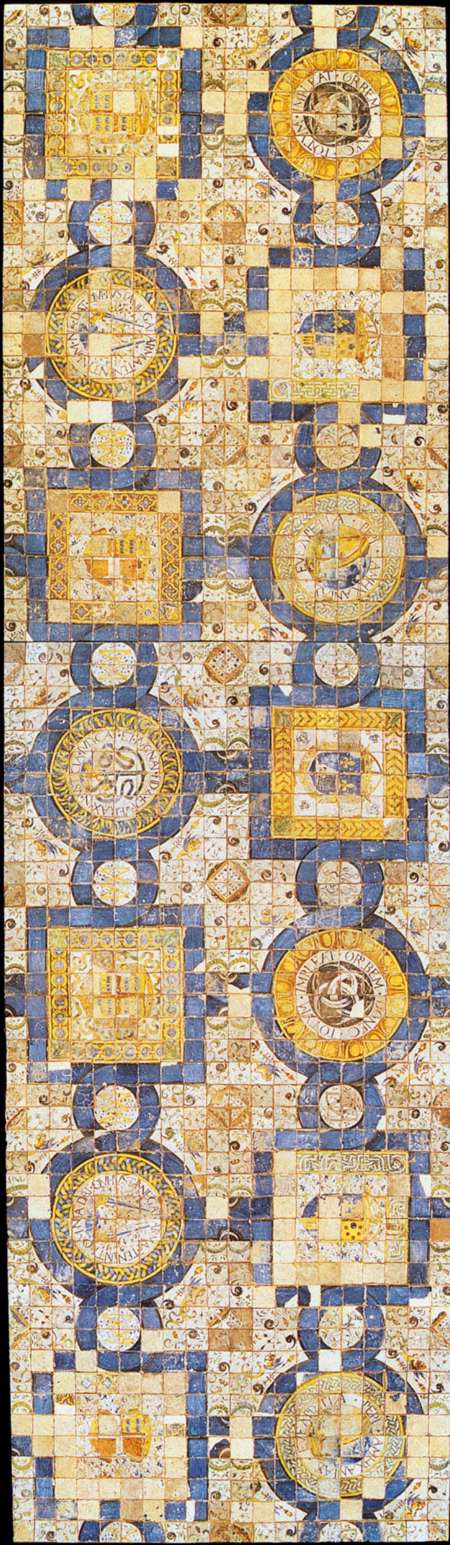
Detail of Ecouen floor by Masséot Abaquesne

The museum has a notable collection of 16th-century French ceramics, mostly designed as luxury dishware, in place of gold or silver. Ceramic tile was also used extensively on floors and walls of châteaux like Écouen. At Écouen, some of the original floors are still in place, including a section in the royal bed chamber and in the salon of the king. These pavements were commissioned from an artist of Rouen, Masséot Abaquesne, in about 1549–1551.

A section of ceramic floor from the Château of Polisy, dated 1545 and demolished after the Revolution, is on display. It was commissioned by the bishop of Auxerre, François de Dinteville, for one of his residences. The design was inspired by the Italian artist, Sebastiano Serlio, and is based on the coat of arms of the family, with illustrations of the family motto, "Fortune and Virtue".

The collection also includes a number of works from the atelier of Bernard Palissy at the site of the Tuileries Palace in Paris. Palissy was famous for his long and unsuccessful effort to imitate Chinese porcelain. His primary success was his series of rustic plates, often depicting fish and sea life.

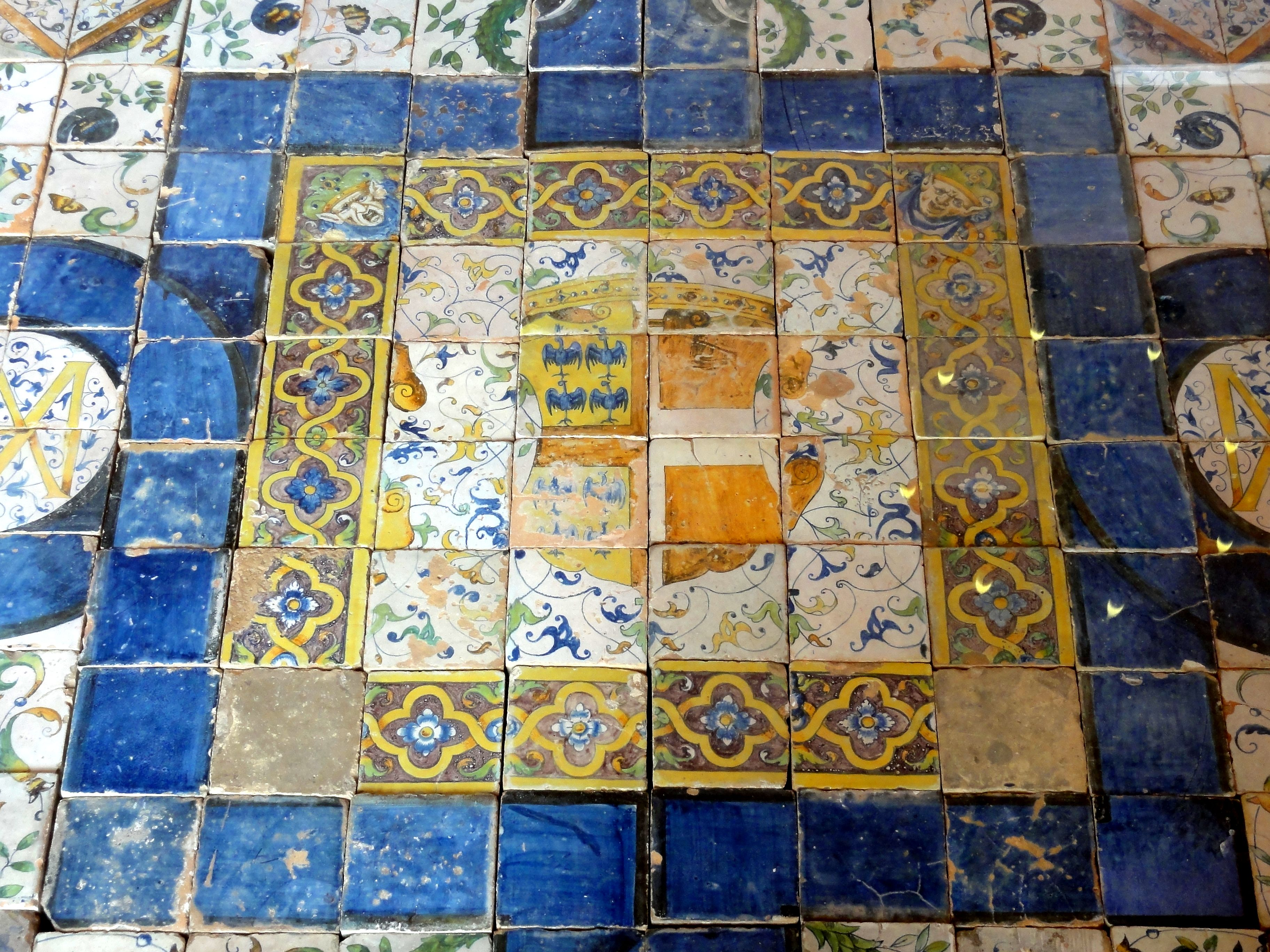
Section of original pavement at Écouen (1549–1551)

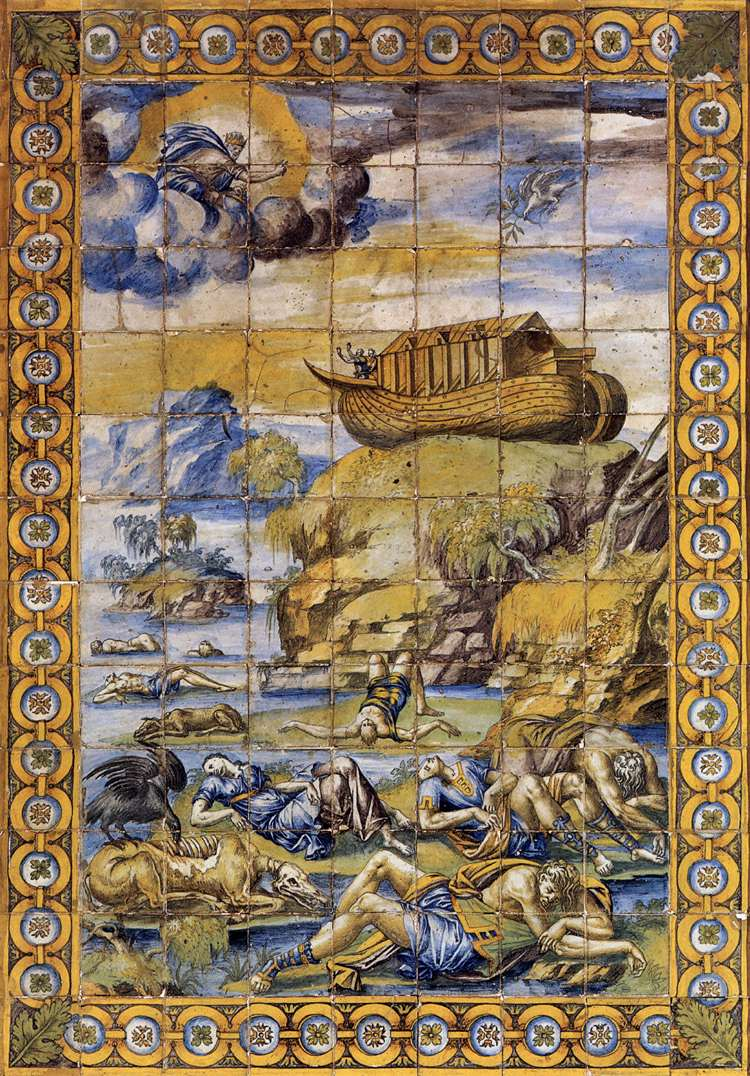
Faience mural of Noah and the Deluge, by Masseot Abaquesne

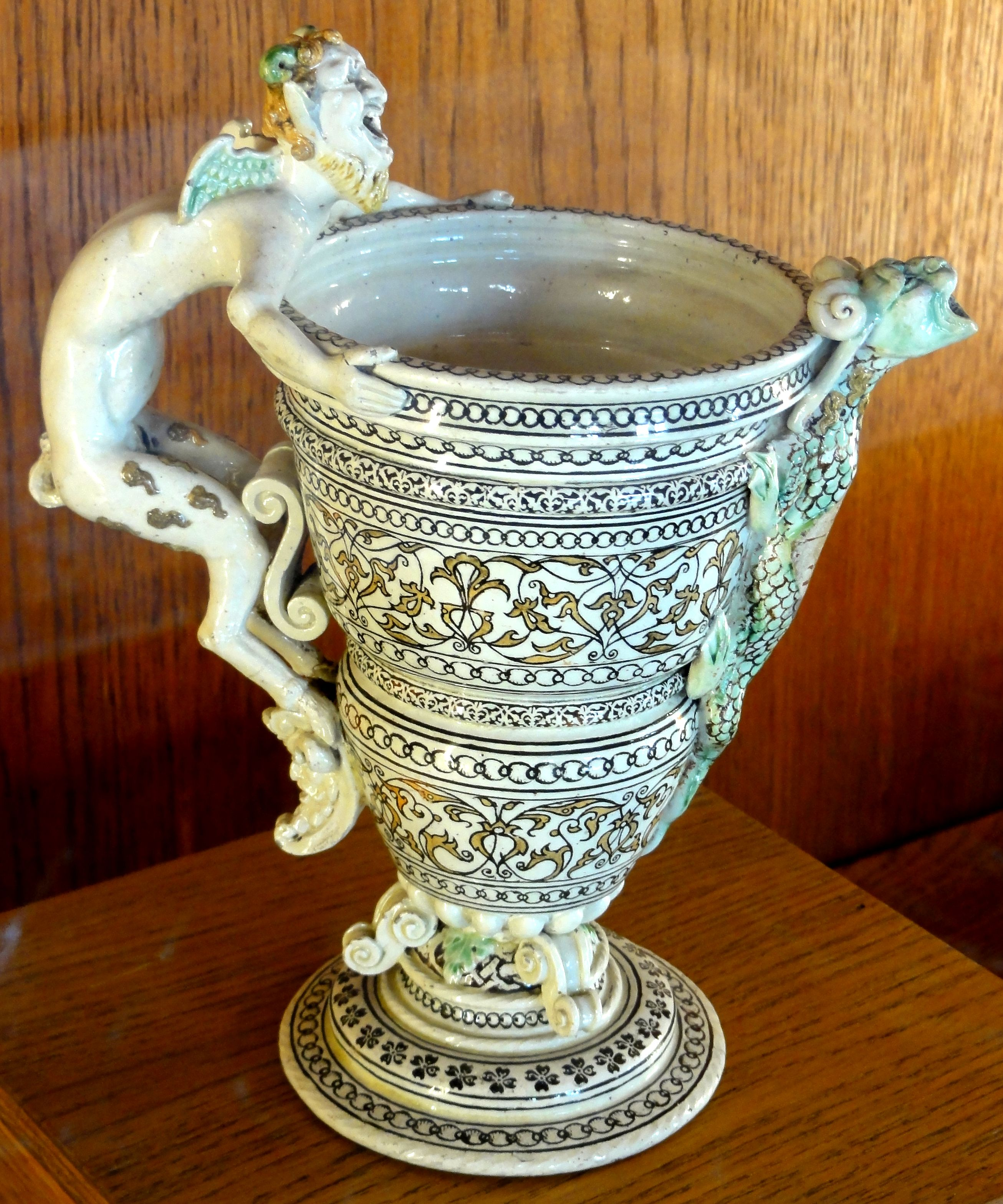
An aiguière with a satyr handle and reptile spout, by the workshop of Saint-Porchaire (1545-1558)

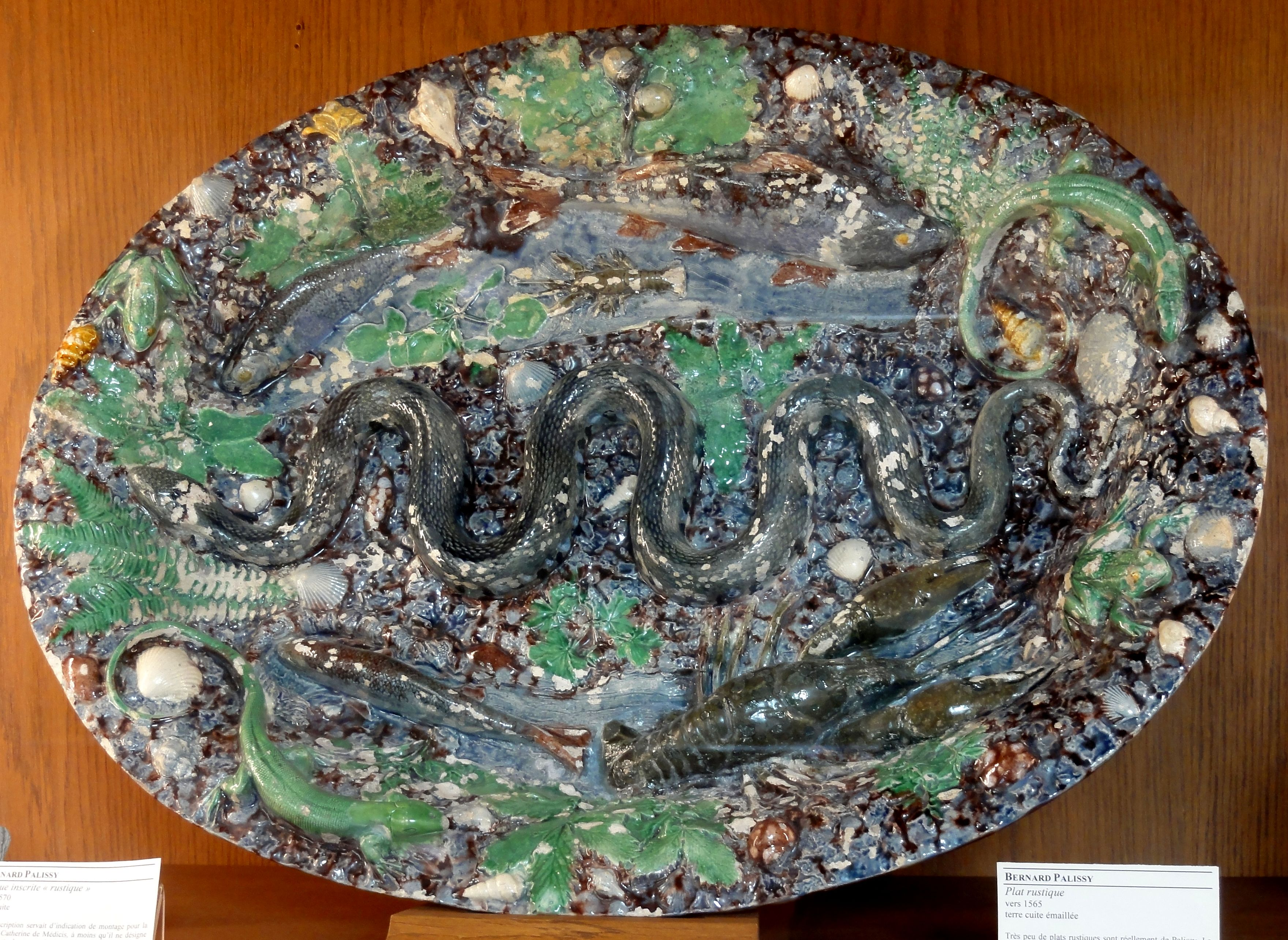
Rustic plate by Bernard Palissy (about 1565)

=== Enamels ===
The craft of painted enamel is particularly well represented in the museum. The major center of this production was Limoges, where enamel had been produced since the 12th century. A new variation was introduced at the end of the 15th century, and it became particularly popular among royal and noble collectors. It involved copper plates, with a layer of flat enamel on one side and a polychrome painting made with layers of colored enamel on the other side. The most important artists in this style and period included Léonard Limosin, whose family produced seven enamel painters. He created series of enamels for Francis I and Henry II. His work included portraits of mythological and religious figures, as well as portraits of the major figures of the Court. He also created the enamels of religious scenes on the altar table in the chapel.

Another important French enamel painter from Limoges was Pierre Courteys, who made a series of portraits of mythological figures of unusually large size. The example of Mercury in the museum collection is signed and dated 1559. Its inspiration appears to be a similar series created for the Palace of Fontainebleau by Rosso Fiorentino. Another important artist with work in the collection is Suzanne de Court, also from a family of enamel painters in Limoges. She was one of the few women artists who were permitted by guild rules to sign their work with their full names.

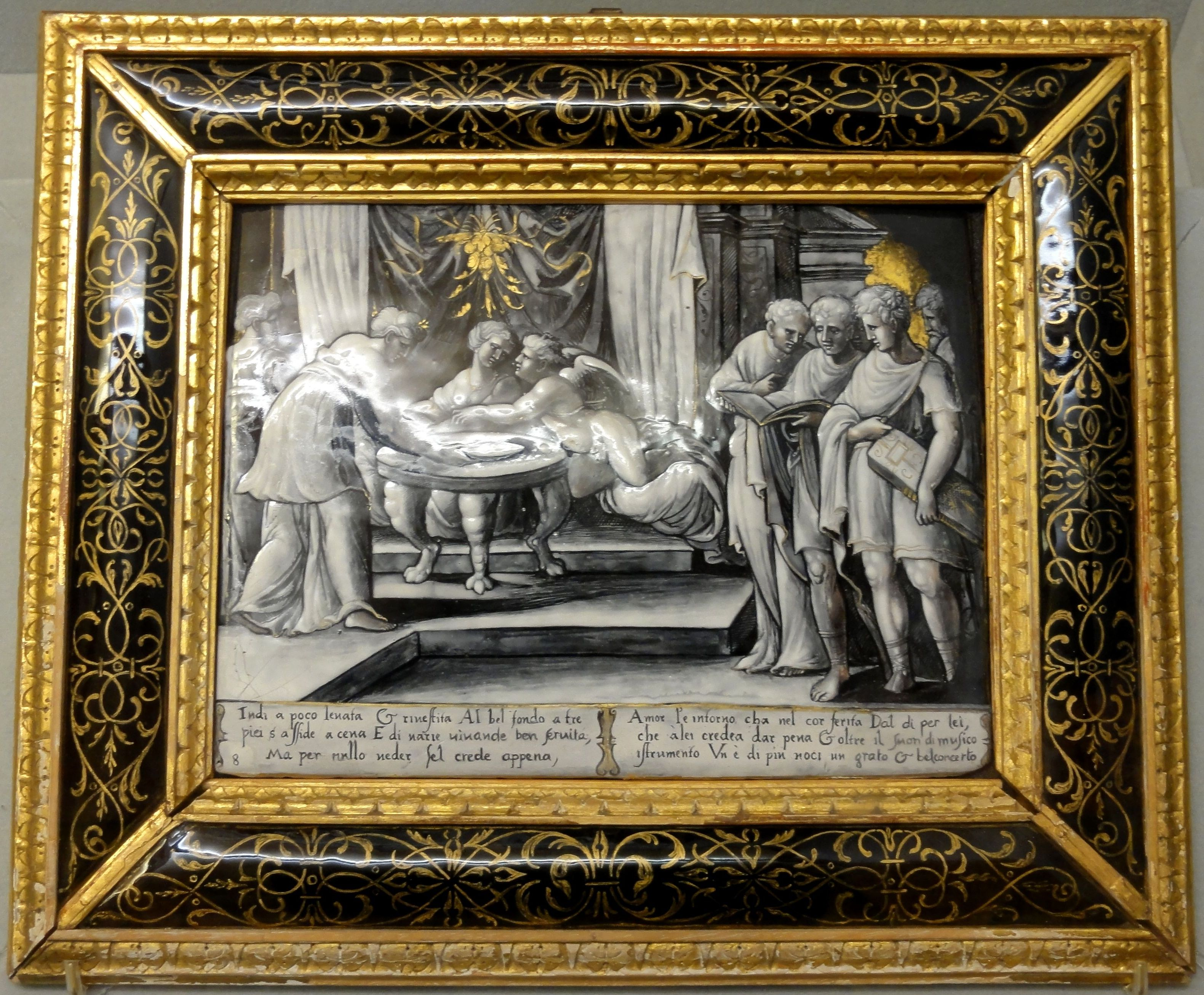
Psyche and Amour at the table, Enamel by Léonard Limosin (1543)

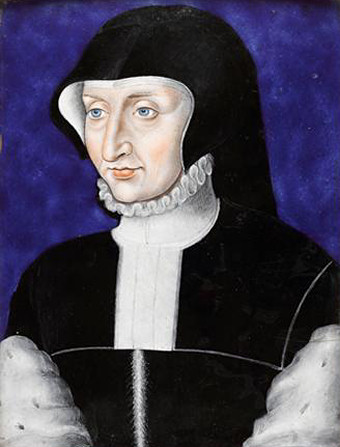
Enamel portrait of Antoinette de Bourbon, Duchess of Guise, by Léonard Limosin.

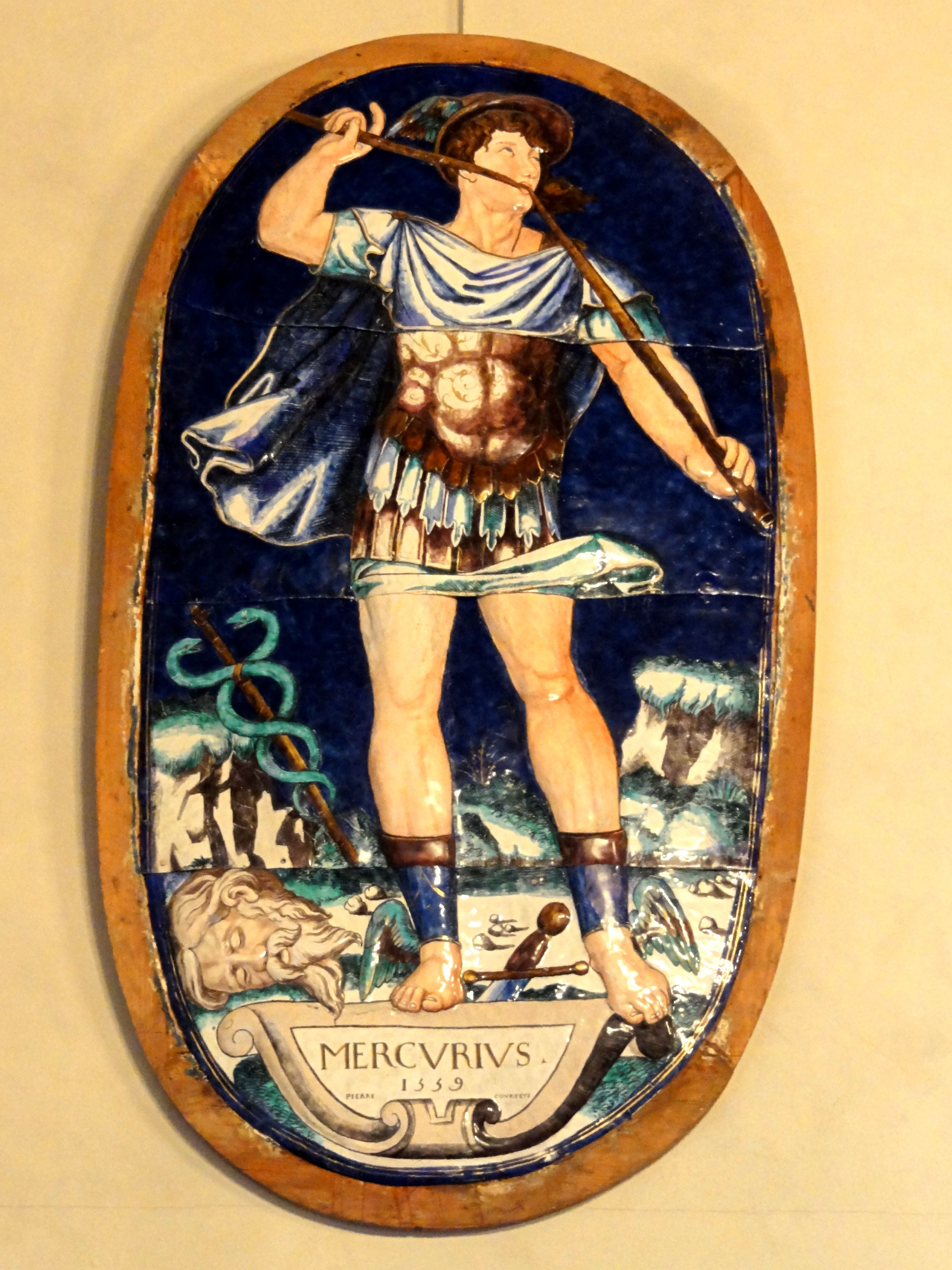
Painted enamel plaque by Pierre Courteys (1559)

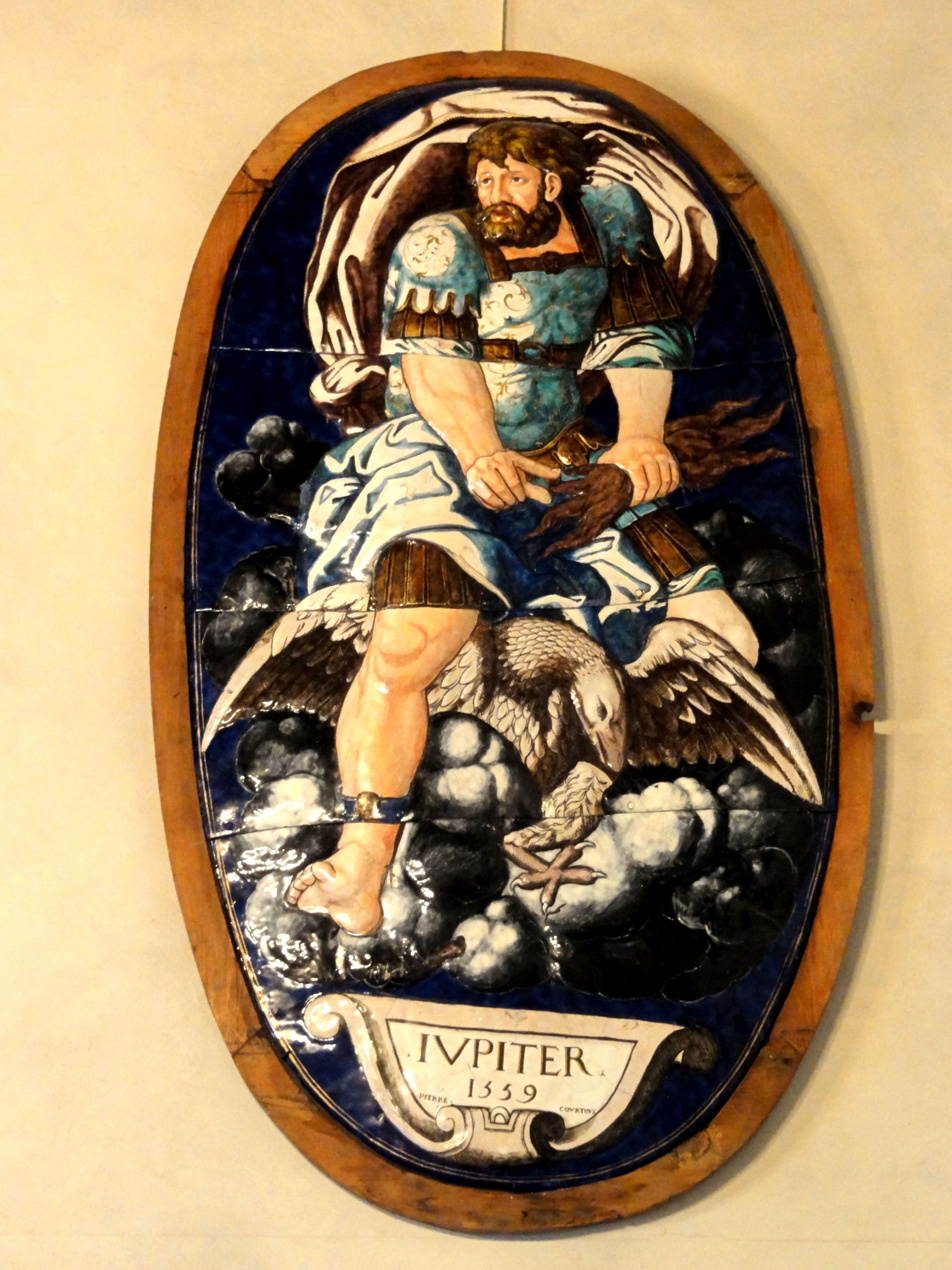
Jupiter, by Pierre Courteys (1559)

=== Jewelry, goldsmithing and silversmithing ===
The museum displays works of some of the most celebrated goldsmiths and silversmiths of the Renaissance. One notable example is the statuette of Daphne by Wenzel Jamnitzer, a German craftsman from Nuremberg, goldsmith to the Holy Roman Emperors. It was made between 1569 and 1576. It portrays the Greek myth of Apollo and Daphne, from the Metamorphoses of Ovid, which was a popular subject in the Renaissance. The nymph Daphne is transformed into a laurel tree by her father, to protect her from the pursuing Apollo. The statuette is made of gilded silver, with branches made of red coral with touches of silver paint.

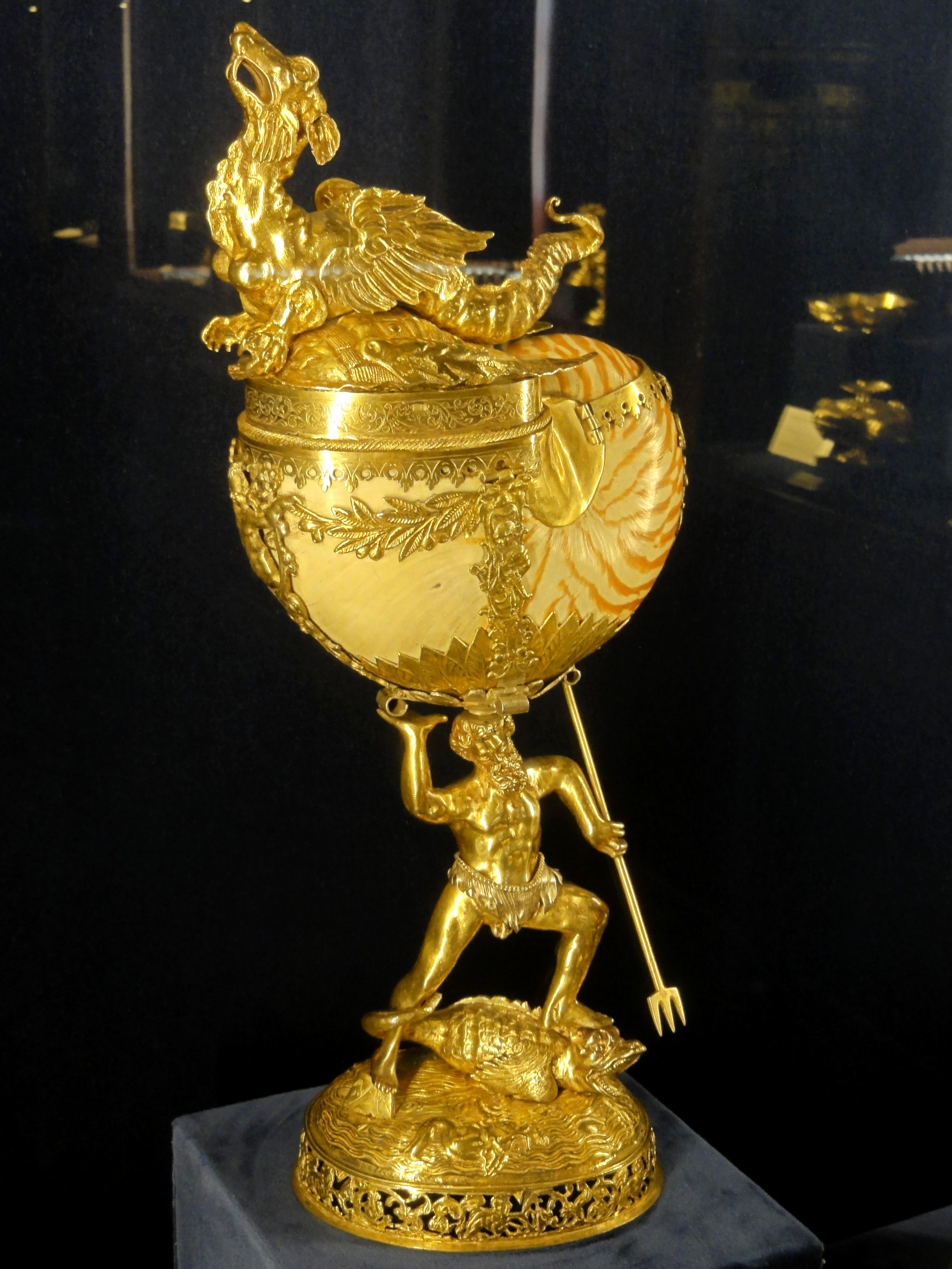
A nautilus figure mounted on a cup, made of gilded silver (Germany, beginning of 17th century)

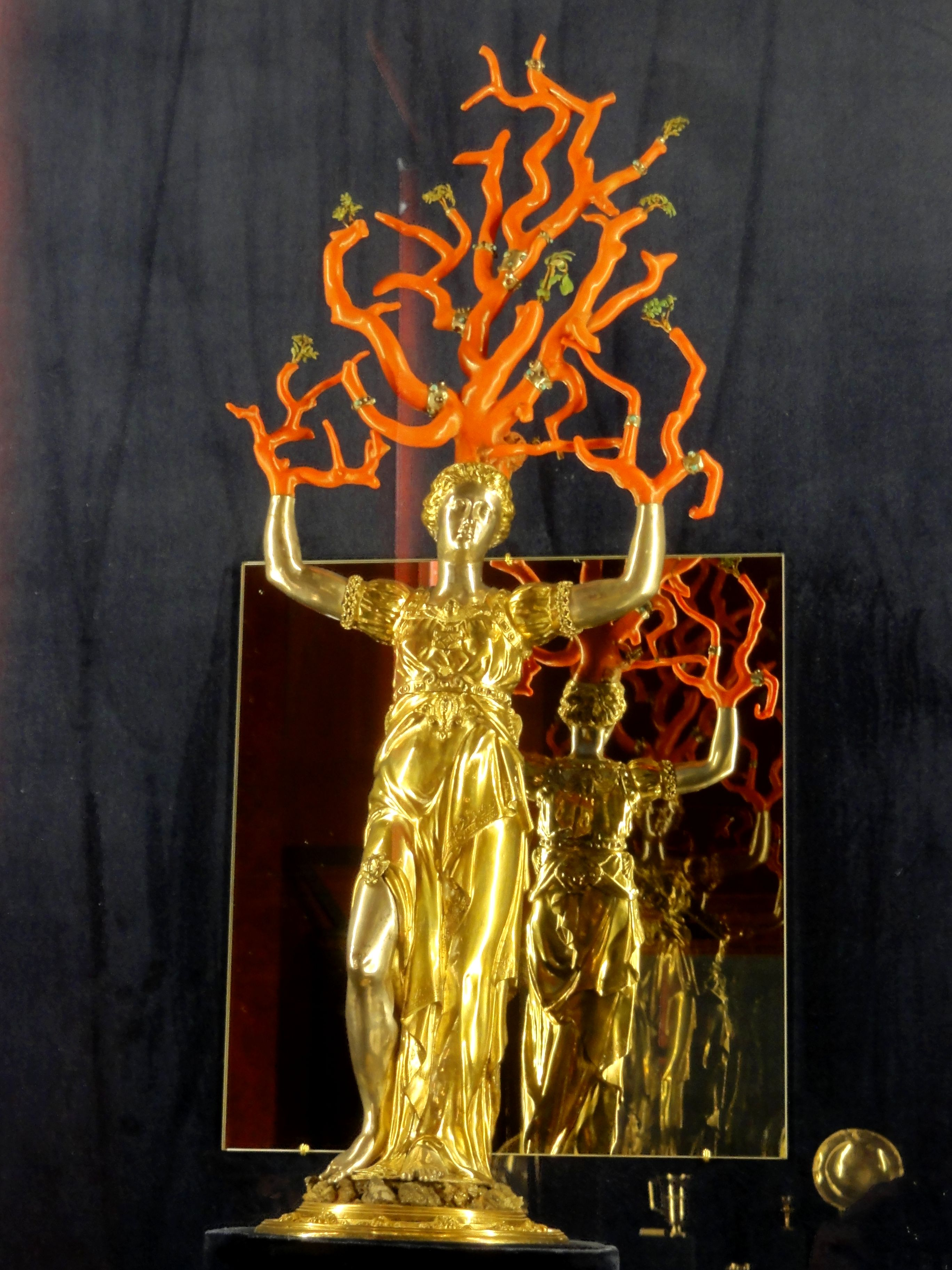
Statuette of Daphné by Wenzel Jamnitzer (1569–76). Gilded silver and coral.

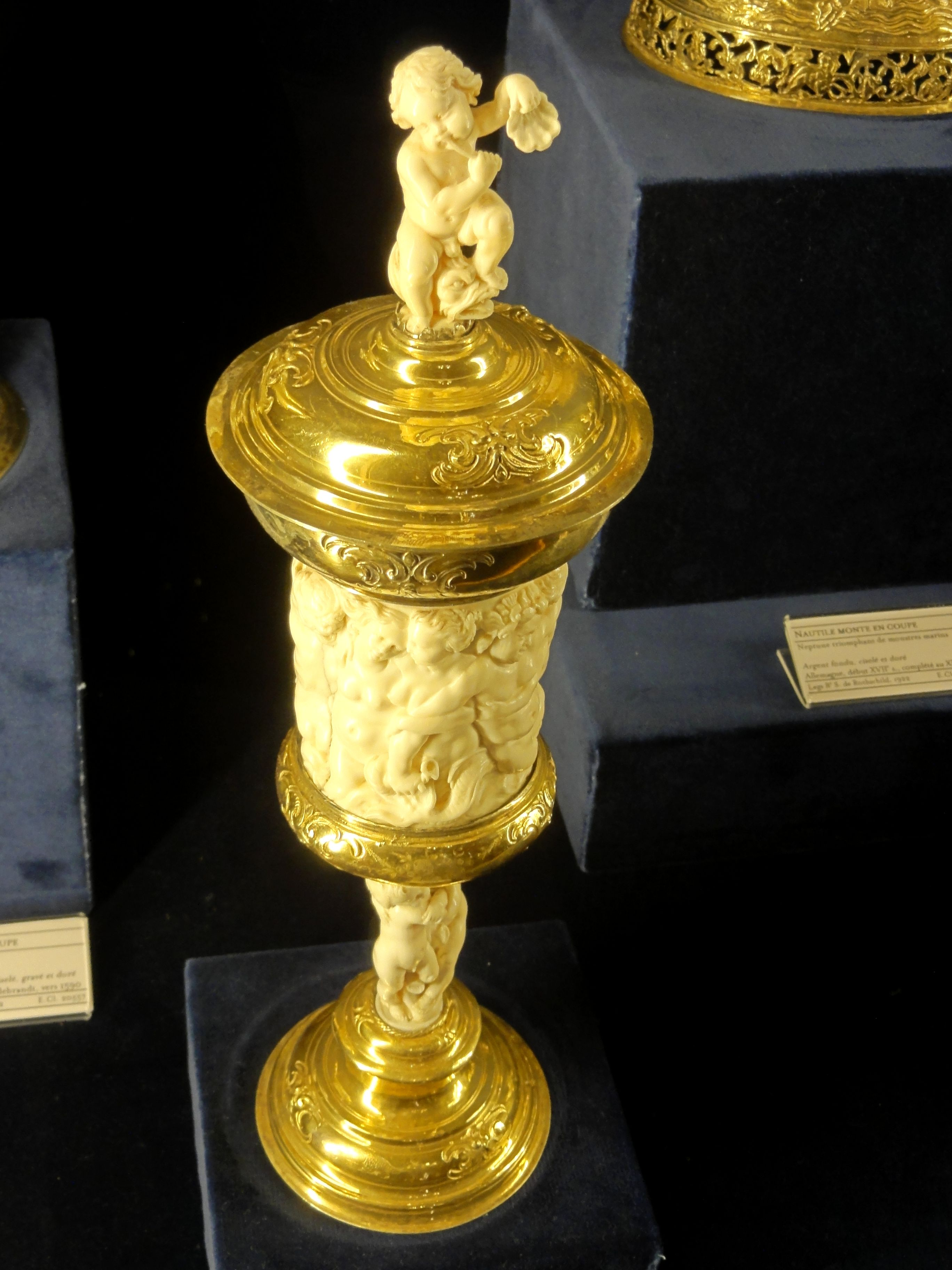
Cup of gilded silver and ivory, by Daniel Zech of Augsburg

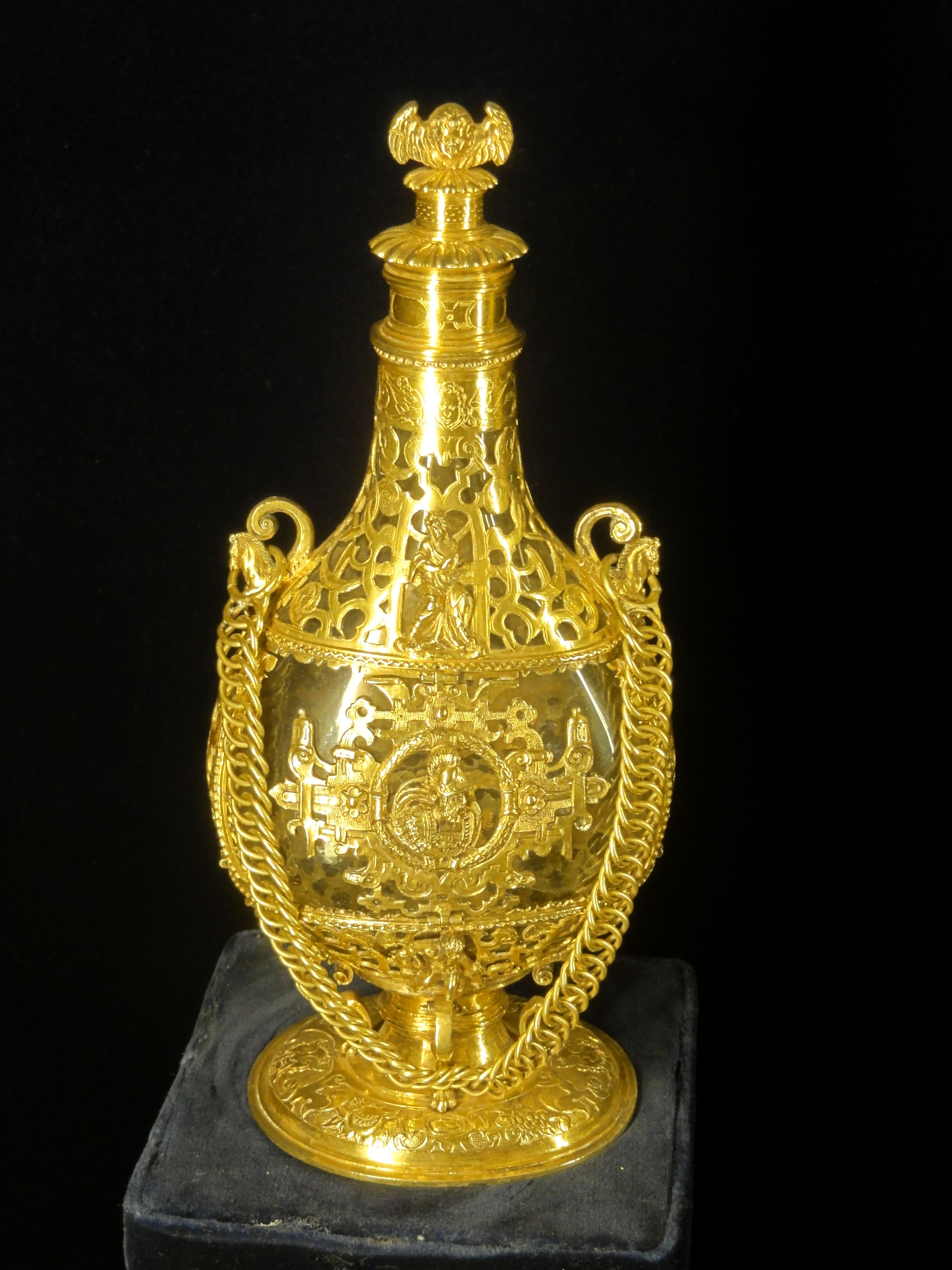
Bottle with gilded chain and decoration, from Nuremberg or Northern Europe

=== Arms and armor ===
The Museum has an exceptional collection of arms and armor, including the gilded ceremonial spurs of Francis I of France, decorated with his emblem, the salamander. These spurs, made in 1515-1525, were made in the first decade of his reign, and were displayed at his funeral in 1547. Another piece in the collection is a dosseret with a high collar, decorated with images of the Minevra and Mars, the deities of war. It was designed to protect the back of the neck, and could be worn either with a suit of armor or as a collar with formal court dress. The collection in the Hall of Arms includes a ceremonial rondache or buckler, a round ceremonial shield, of iron decorated with silver and gold, made in Italy for Charles V, Holy Roman Emperor, showing the enemy soldiers he had conquered submitting to him.

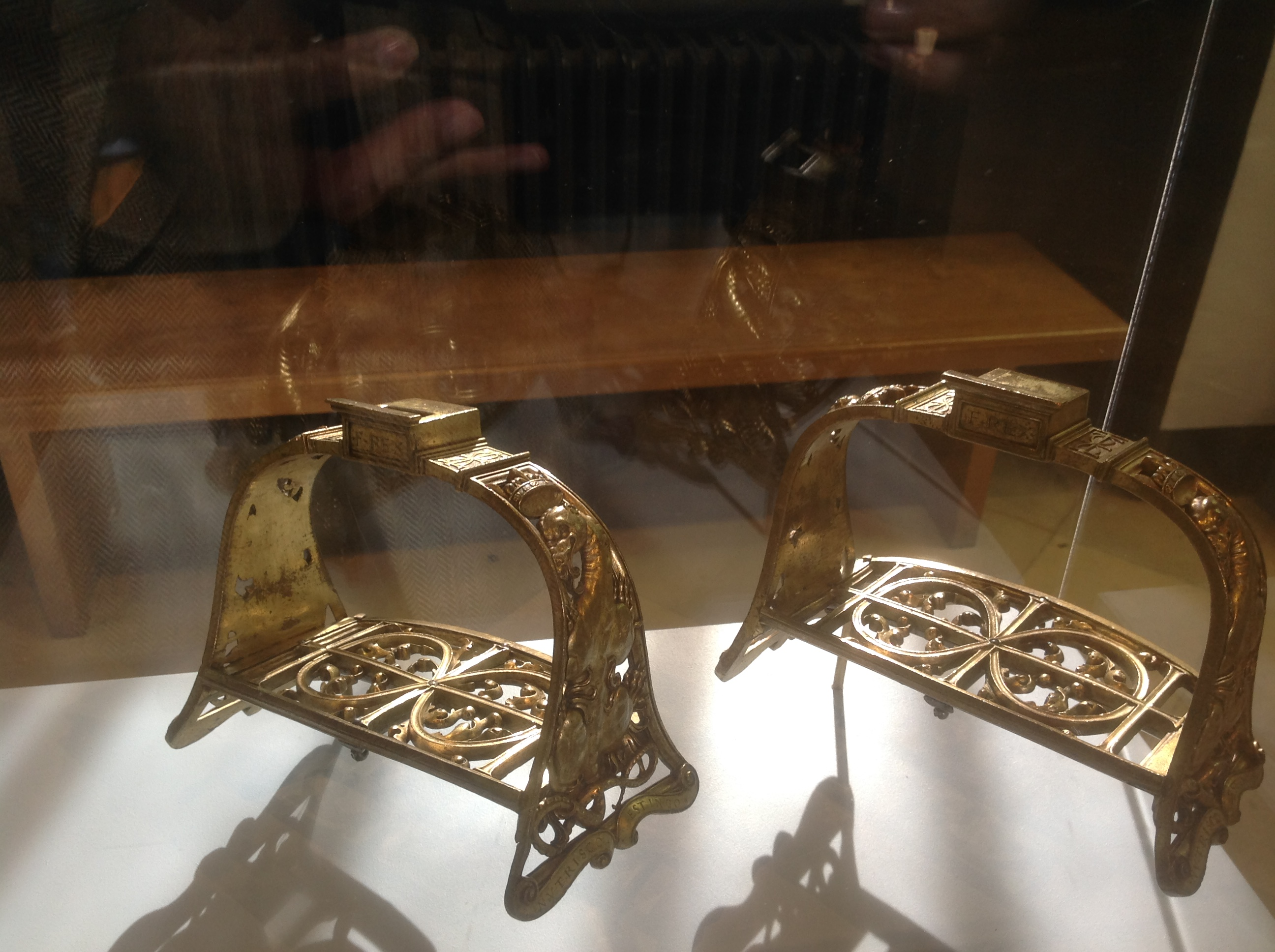
Ceremonial spurs of Francis I of France (1515-1525)

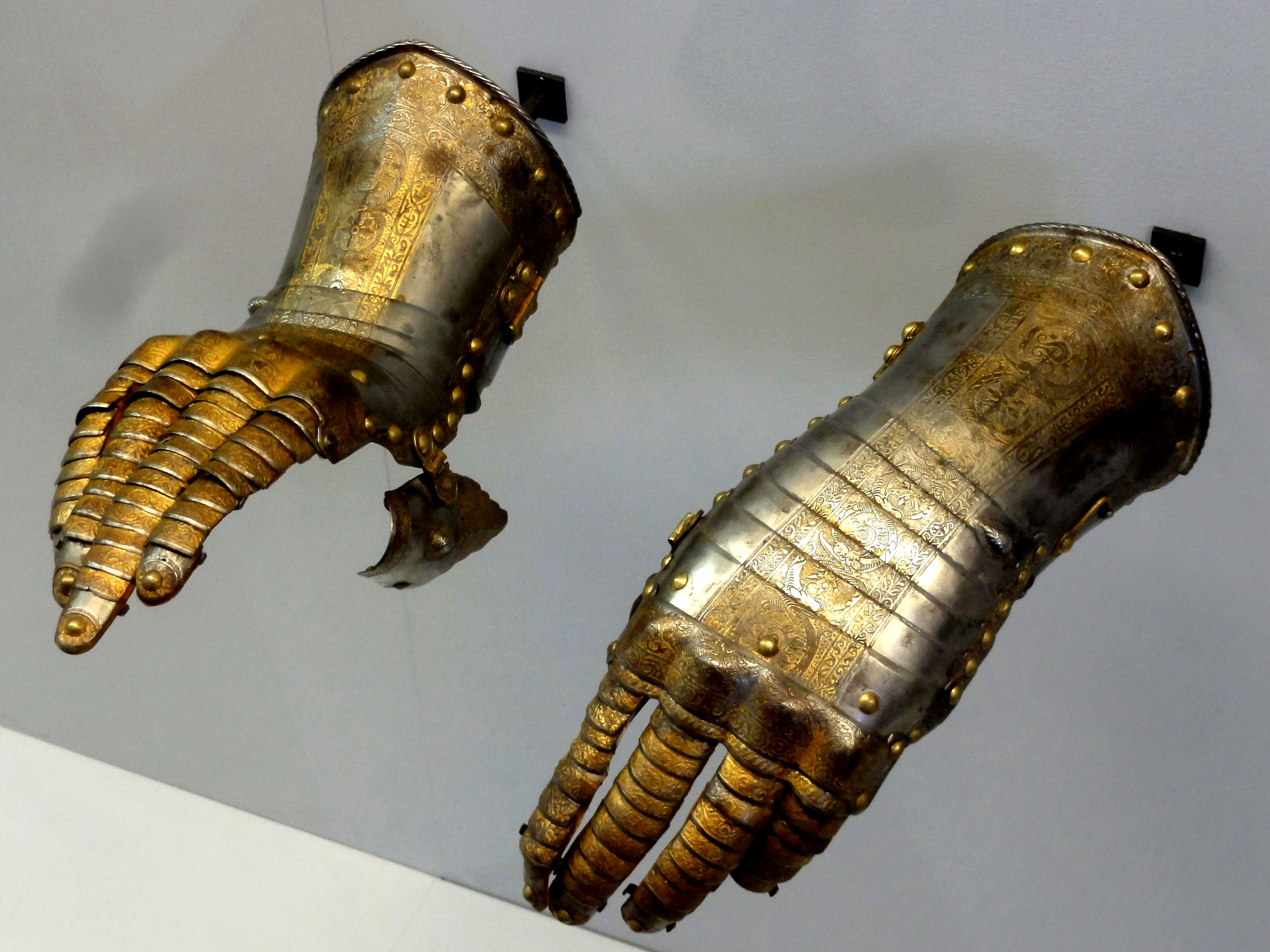
Armored gloves

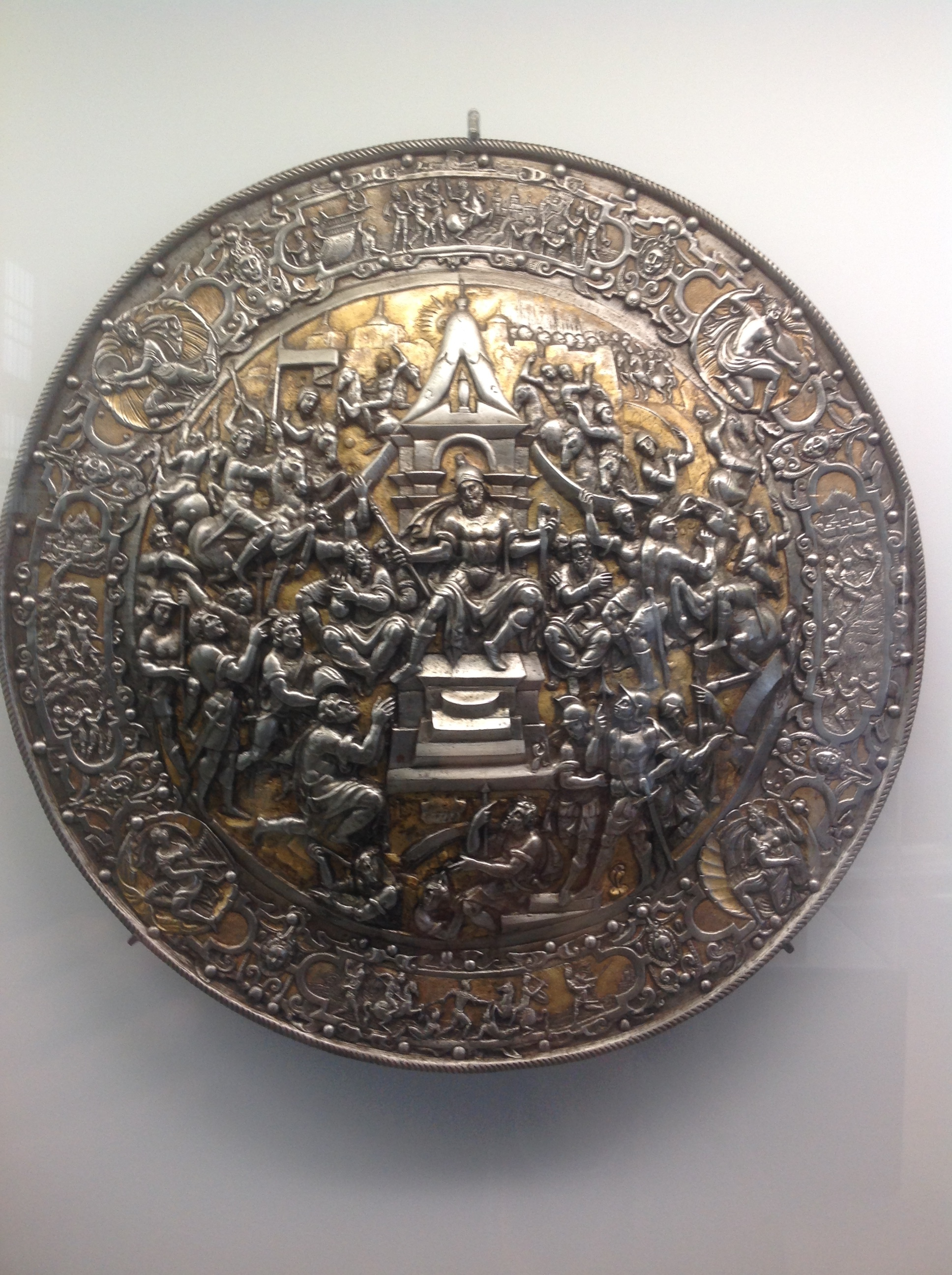
Rondache or buckler of Charles V, Holy Roman Emperor, Italy, 1555

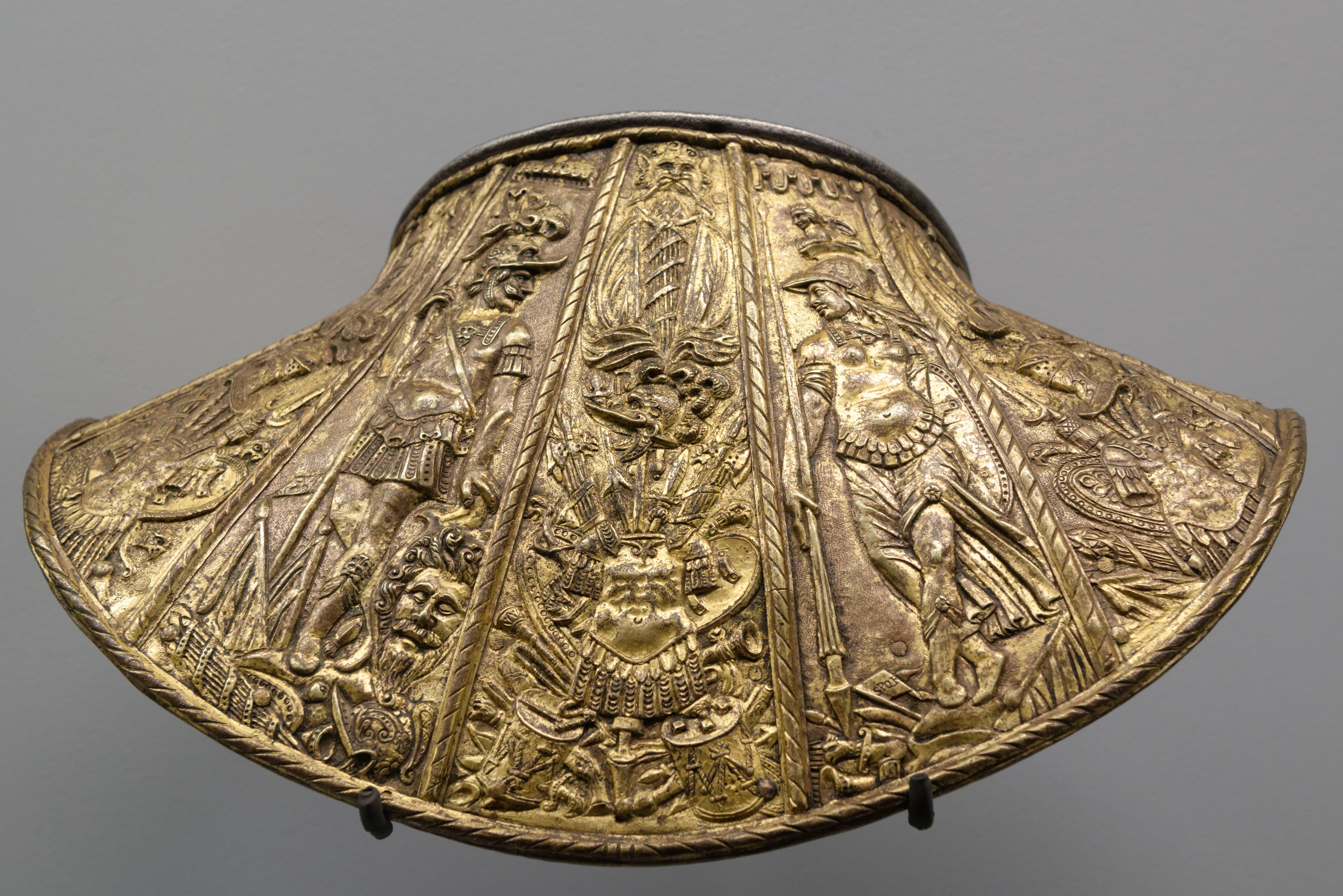
A dosseret or back plate for protecting the back of the neck, with figures of Mars and Minerva (end of 16th century)

=== Scientific instruments, clocks and mechanical devices ===
The museum houses one of the most important European collections of Renaissance scientific instruments, including examples of the astrolabe, clocks, globes, the solar cadran and automatons. One of the most famous items is the mechanical model ship, called the Nef of Charles V, made in about 1590 and attributed to Hans Schlottheim, which originally was in the cabinet of curiosities of the Elector of Saxe in Dresden. It contains a clock which activates seven different mechanisms, sounds the quarter hour, and sets the mechanical figures in motion: Tiny trumpeters and drummers play, the electors of the Holy Roman Empire promenade in a circle around the Emperor on his throne on the stern of the ship, and the tiny cannons fire. The display includes a video that shows all of mechanisms functioning.

Other objects in the collection include an astrolabic clock attributed to Jean Naze, a clock maker from Lyon. It indicates the time, the course of the sun, the phases of the moon and the positions of the stars. Other objects include a cone-shaped cup that functions as a sundial and an enigmatic mechanical device with rows of small turning wheels, placed inside what appeared to be a book. It bears the emblems and symbols of Henry II of France, and is thought to have been an early coding device. It was made about 1547-1559.

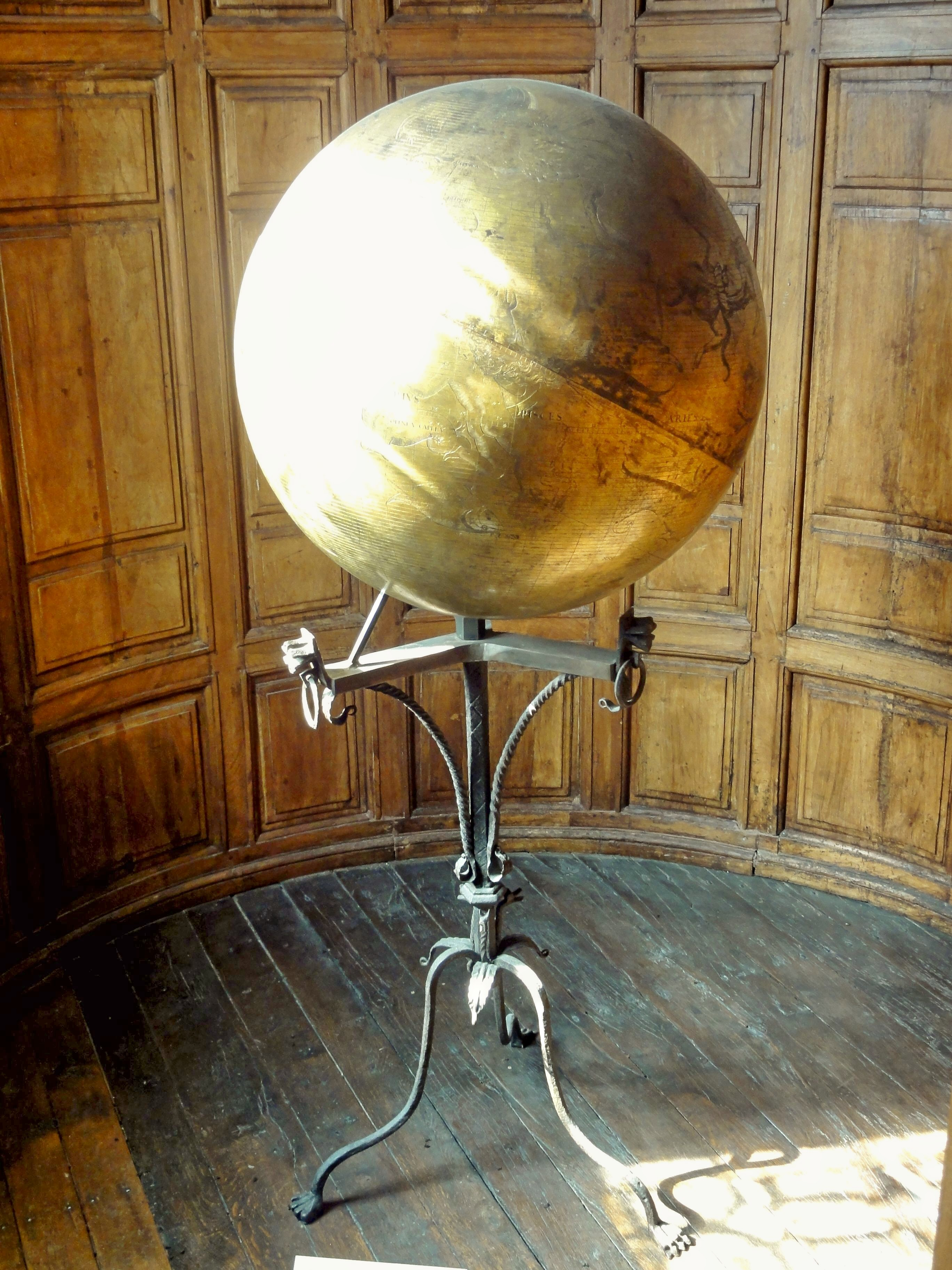
Celestial sphere showing constellations (1502)

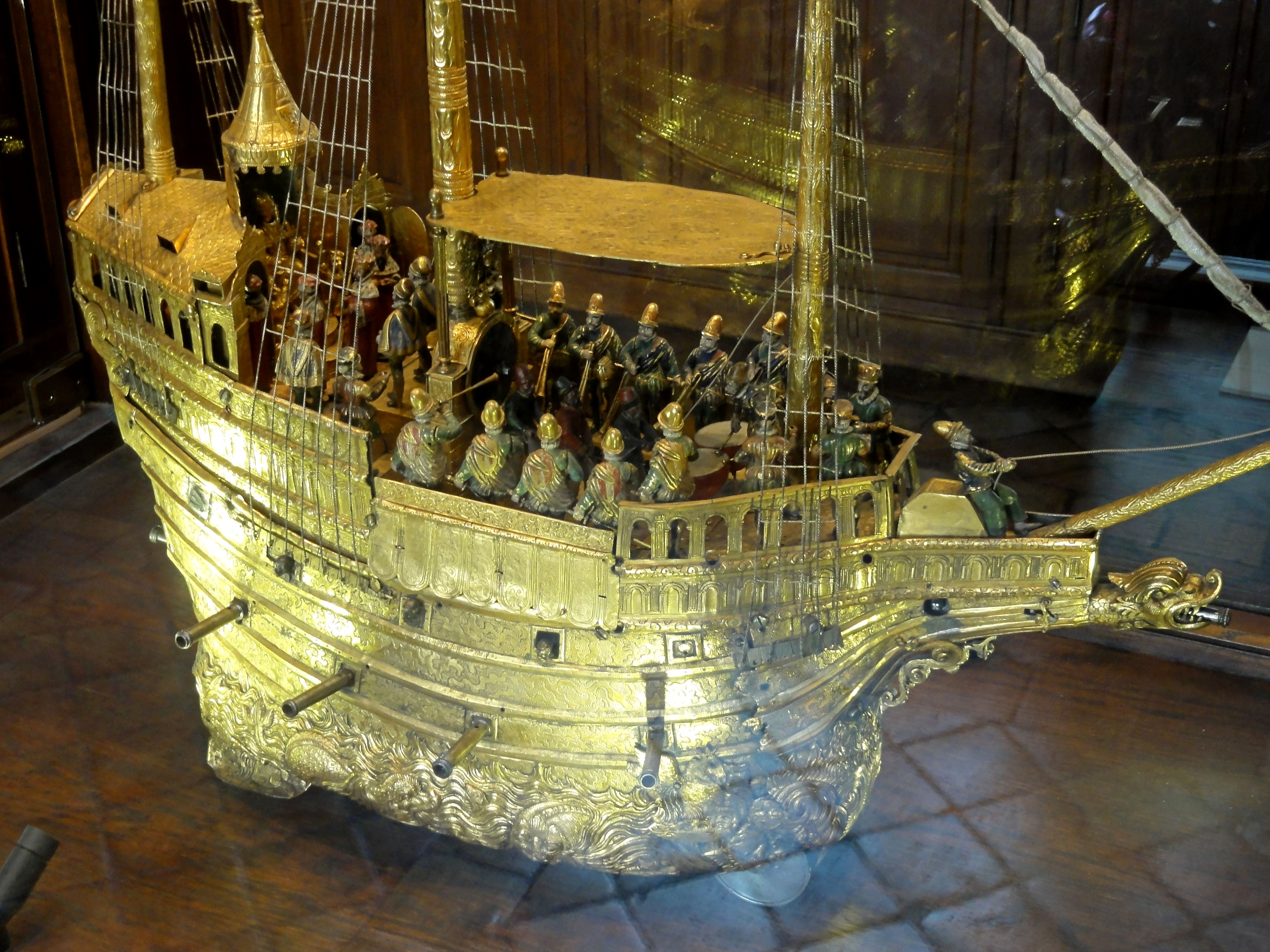
Mechanical model ship made for Charles V (about 1590)

=== Rooms ===
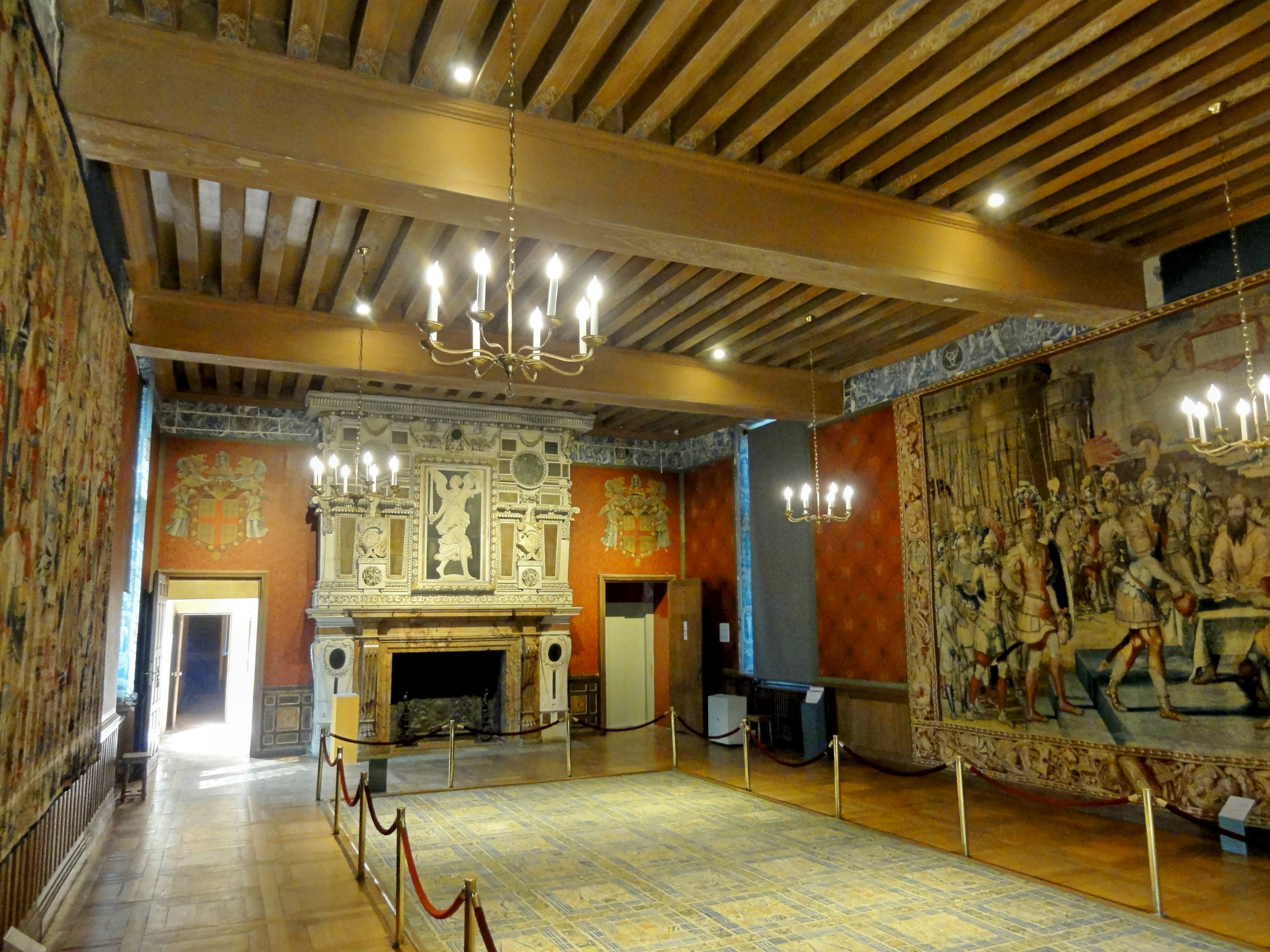
Grand hall of the King

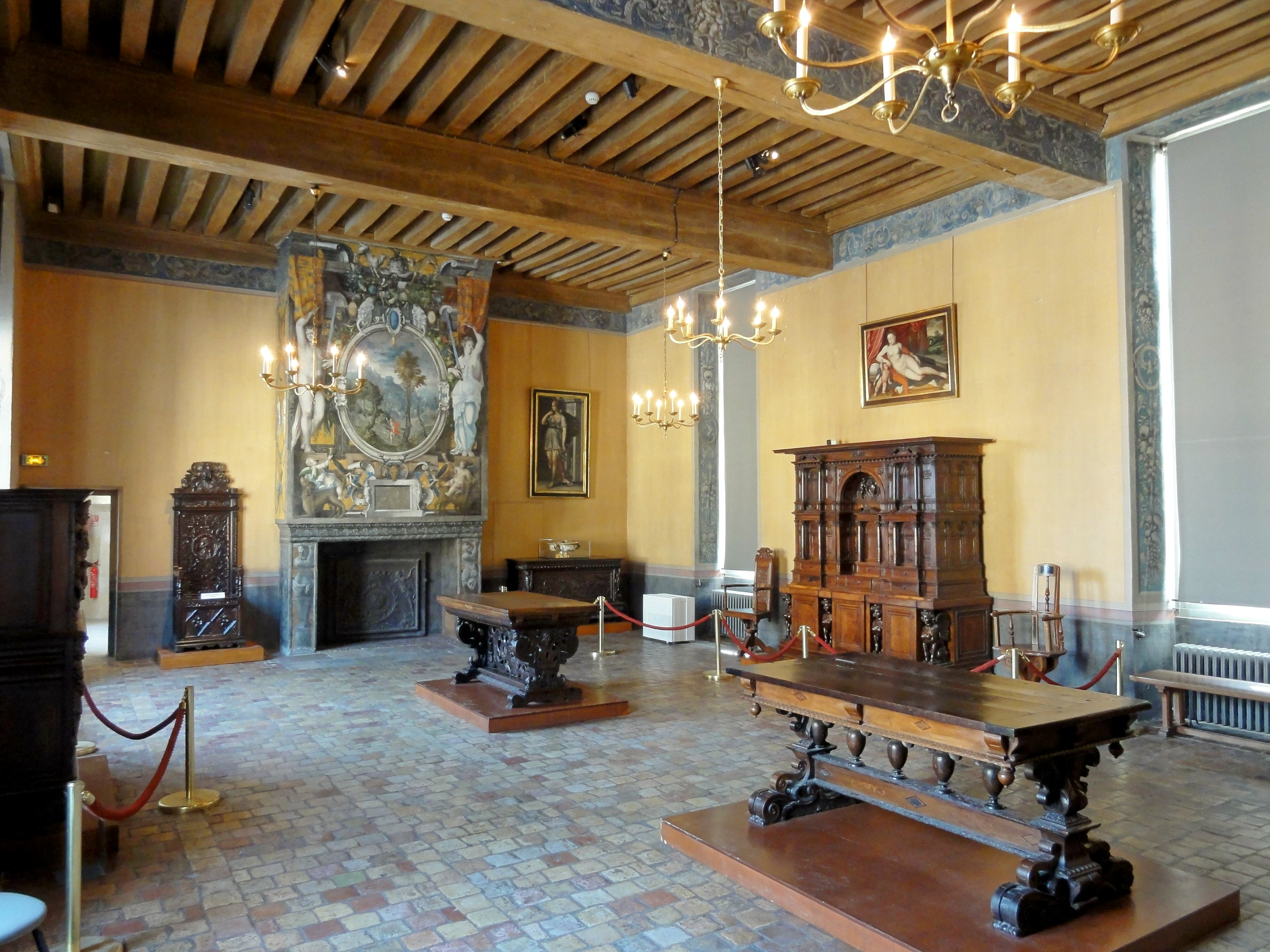
The Appartement du connétable, Anne de Montmorency

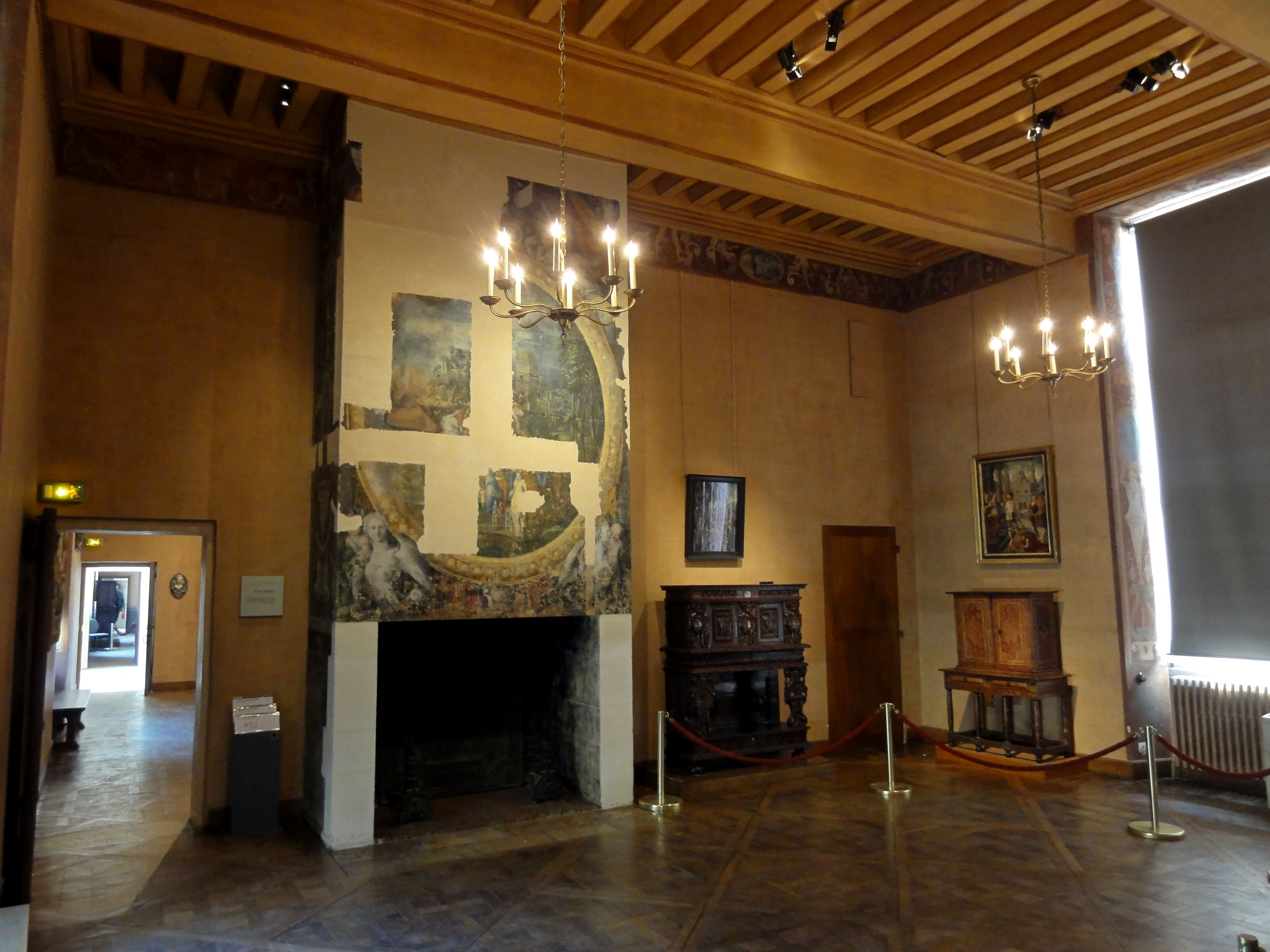
Room of Madeleine of Savoy, his wife

== Bibliography ==
- Musée National de la Renaissance, Château d'Écouen, Guide des collections, Éditions de la Réunion des musées nationaux, (2017), (in French), ISBN 978-2-7118-6422-5
- Le Guide du Patrimoine en France: Monuments Historiques, Éditions du Patrimoine, Centre des Monuments Nationaux, Paris (2002), (in French), ISBN 978-2-85822-760-0
