= Waddesdon Bequest =

Collection of Renaissance art in the British Museum

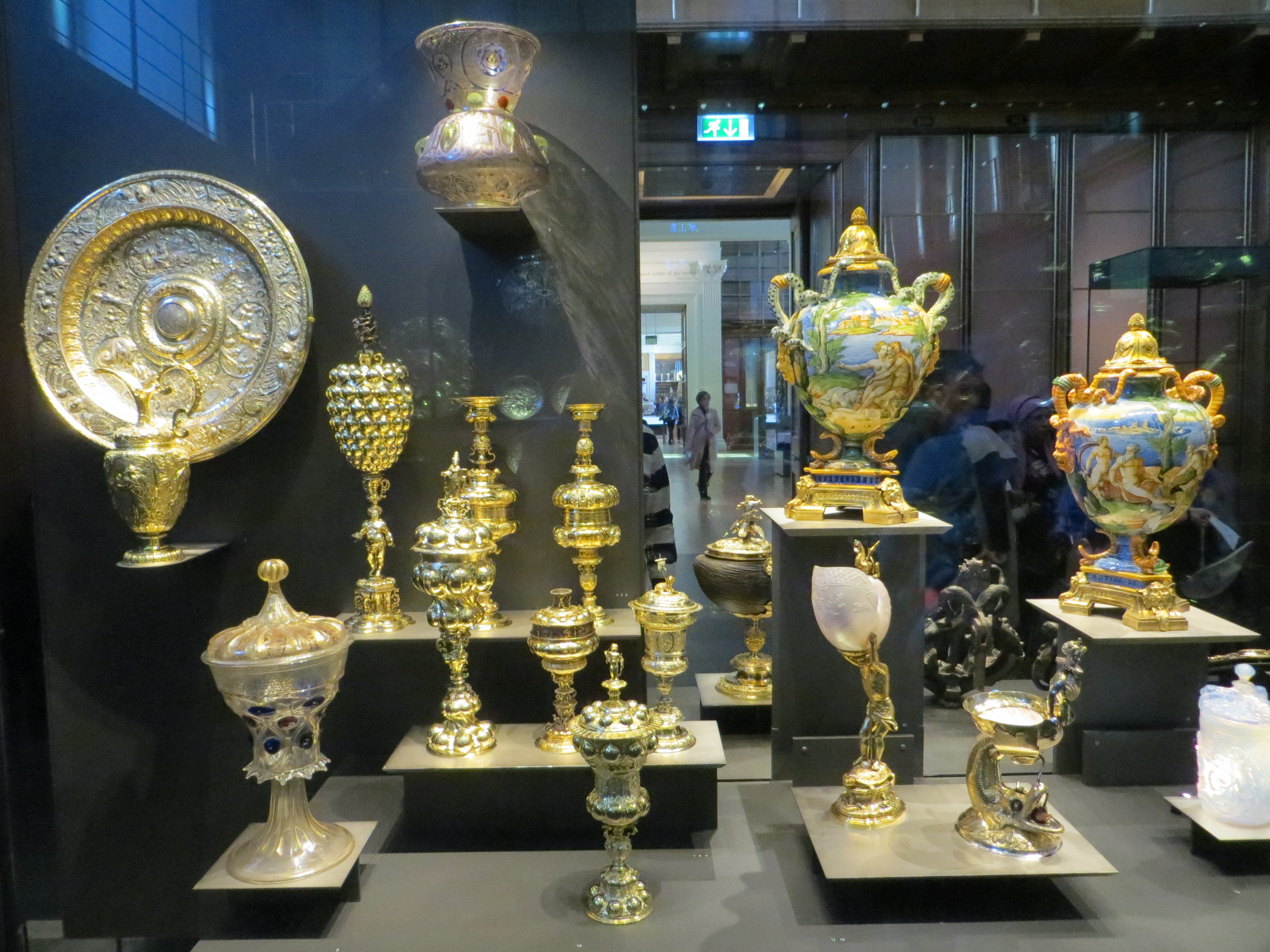
The new 2015 display, with Renaissance metalware, most in silver-gilt, and maiolica

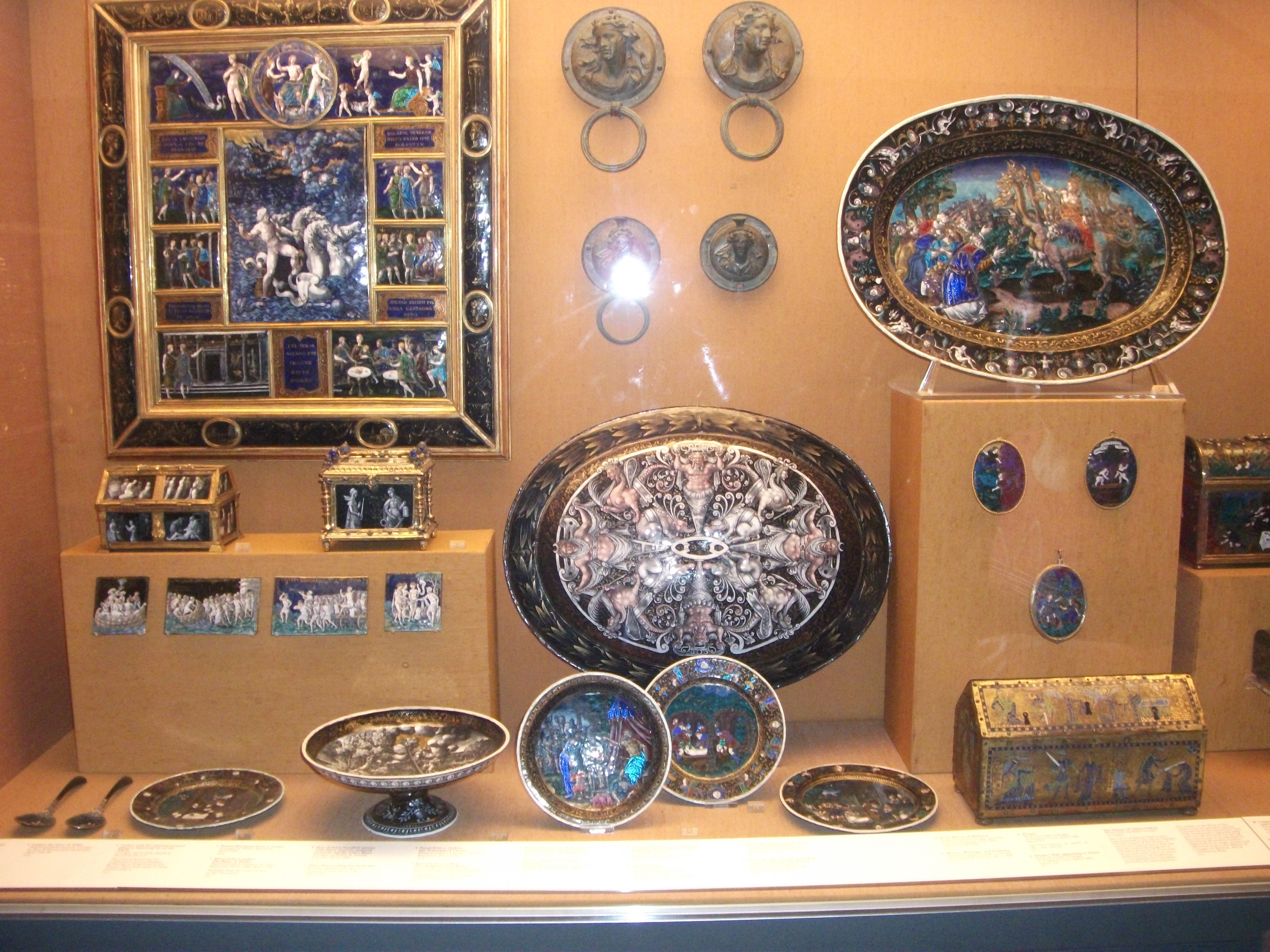
Display in 2014, mostly of Renaissance enamel, but including ancient handle mounts and the St Valerie chasse reliquary

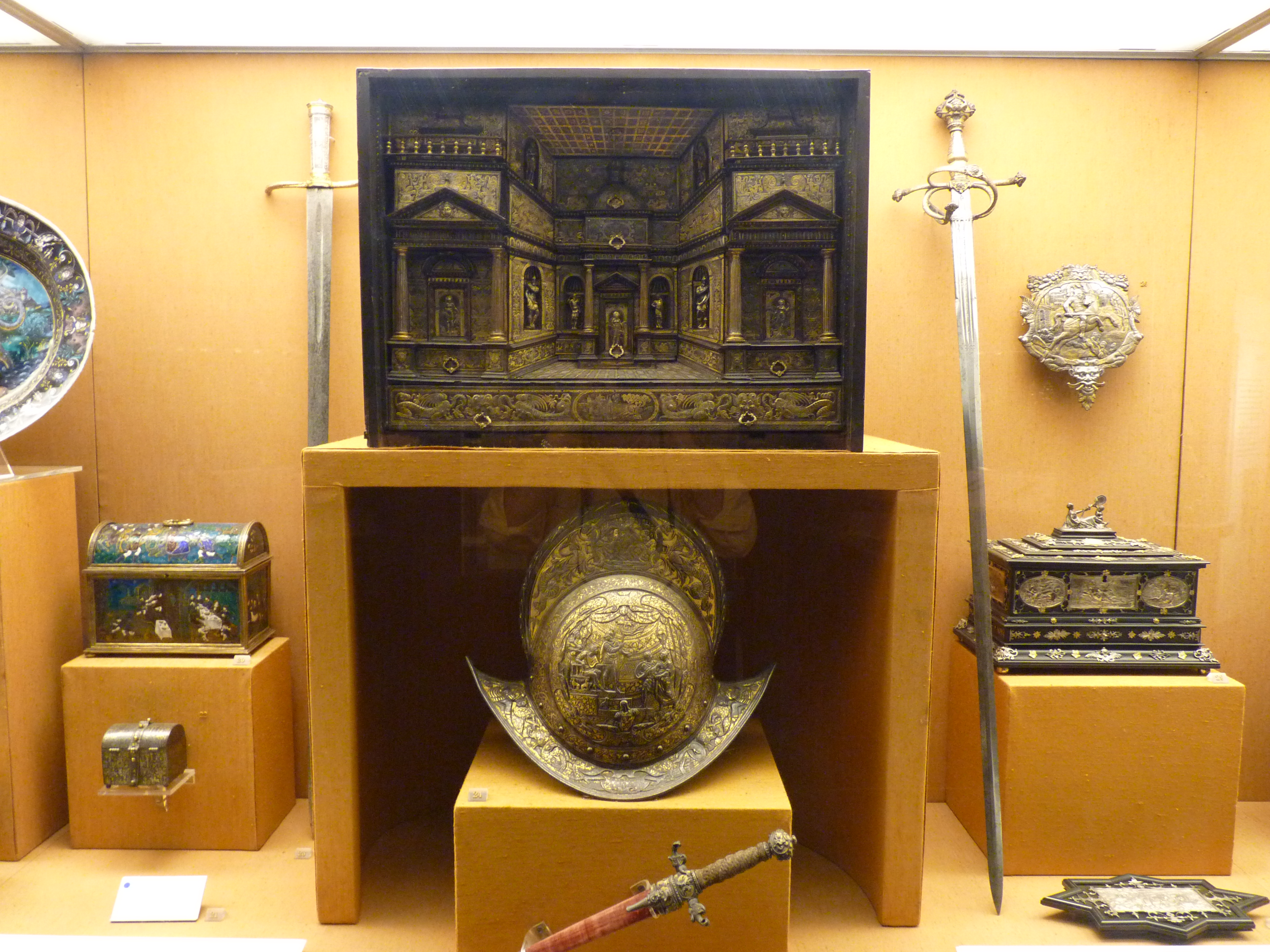
Another display in Room 45, mostly of objects in iron or Limoges enamel

In 1898, Baron Ferdinand de Rothschild bequeathed to the British Museum as the Waddesdon Bequest the contents from his New Smoking Room at Waddesdon Manor. This consisted of a wide-ranging collection of almost 300 objets d'art et de vertu, which included exquisite examples of jewellery, plate, enamel, carvings, glass and maiolica. One of the earlier objects is the outstanding Holy Thorn Reliquary, probably created in the 1390s in Paris for John, Duke of Berry. The collection is in the tradition of a schatzkammer, or treasure house, (and is referred to as such by some writers) such as those formed by the Renaissance princes of Europe; indeed, the majority of the objects are from late Renaissance Europe, although there are several important medieval pieces, and outliers from classical antiquity and medieval Syria.

Following the sequence of the museum's catalogue numbers, and giving the first number for each category, the bequest consists of: "bronzes", handles and a knocker (WB.1); arms, armour and ironwork (WB.5); enamels (WB.19); glass (WB.53); Italian maiolica (WB.60); "cups etc in gold and hard stone" (WB.66); silver plate (WB.87); jewellery (WB.147); cutlery (WB.201); "caskets, etc" (WB.217); carvings in wood and stone (WB.231–265). There is no group for paintings, and WB.174, a portrait miniature on vellum in a wooden frame, is included with the jewellery, though this is because the subject is wearing a pendant in the collection.

The collection was assembled for a particular place, and to reflect a particular aesthetic; other parts of Ferdinand Rothschild's collection contain objects in very different styles, and the Bequest should not be taken to reflect the totality of his taste. Here what most appealed to Ferdinand Rothschild were intricate, superbly executed, highly decorated and rather ostentatious works of the Late Gothic, Renaissance and Mannerist periods. Few of the objects could be said to rely on either simplicity or Baroque sculptural movement for their effect, though several come from periods and places where much Baroque work was being made. A new display for the collection, which under the terms of the bequest must be kept and displayed together, opened on 11 June 2015.

== History ==
The collection was started by Baron Ferdinand's father, Baron Anselm von Rothschild (1803–1874), and may include some objects from earlier Rothschild collections. For Mayer Amschel Rothschild (1744–1812) of Frankfurt, who began the prominence of the family, his business dealing in coins, "antiques, medals, and objects of display" preceded and financed his banking operations, and most Rothschilds continued to collect art.

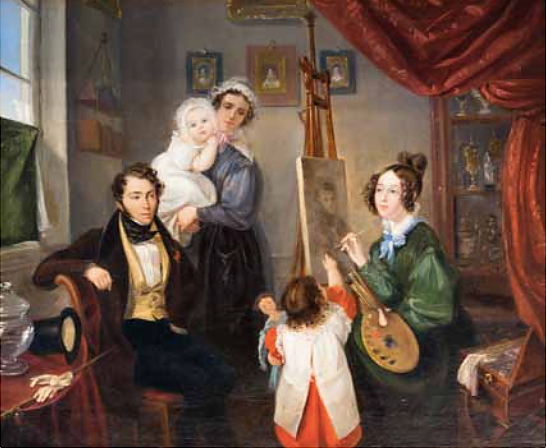
Self-portrait with her family by Charlotte Nathan Rothschild, Baron Ferdinand's mother, 1838. Part of Baron Anselm's collection can be seen behind her.

At least one of the objects now in the British Museum can be seen in a cabinet in the background of a family portrait from 1838 (left), the year before Ferdinand was born. In his Reminiscences Ferdinand recalled his excitement as a child when he was allowed to help wrap and unwrap his father's collection, which spent the summers in a strongroom when the family left Vienna for a country villa.

The period after the French Revolution and Napoleonic Wars offered tremendous opportunities for collectors of the decorative arts of the medieval and Renaissance periods. These categories were valued very little by the art market in general, and metalwork was routinely sold for its bullion value alone. Some of the older objects in precious metal in the collection may have first been received by the family as part of banking transactions; ownership of such pieces had always been partly a way to get some use from capital. Ferdinand records several complaints that his father did not make more use of his opportunities, but in his last years Anselm began to expand his collecting range, and it was he who bought both the Holy Thorn Reliquary and the Ghisi Shield. This golden age for collectors had passed by the time Ferdinand inherited his part of his father's collection in 1874, which was also the year he bought the Waddesdon estate and began to build there. Ferdinand continued to expand the collection until his death in 1898, mostly using dealers, and expanding the range of objects collected. In particular, Ferdinand expanded to around fifty the ten or so pieces of jewellery in his father's collection.

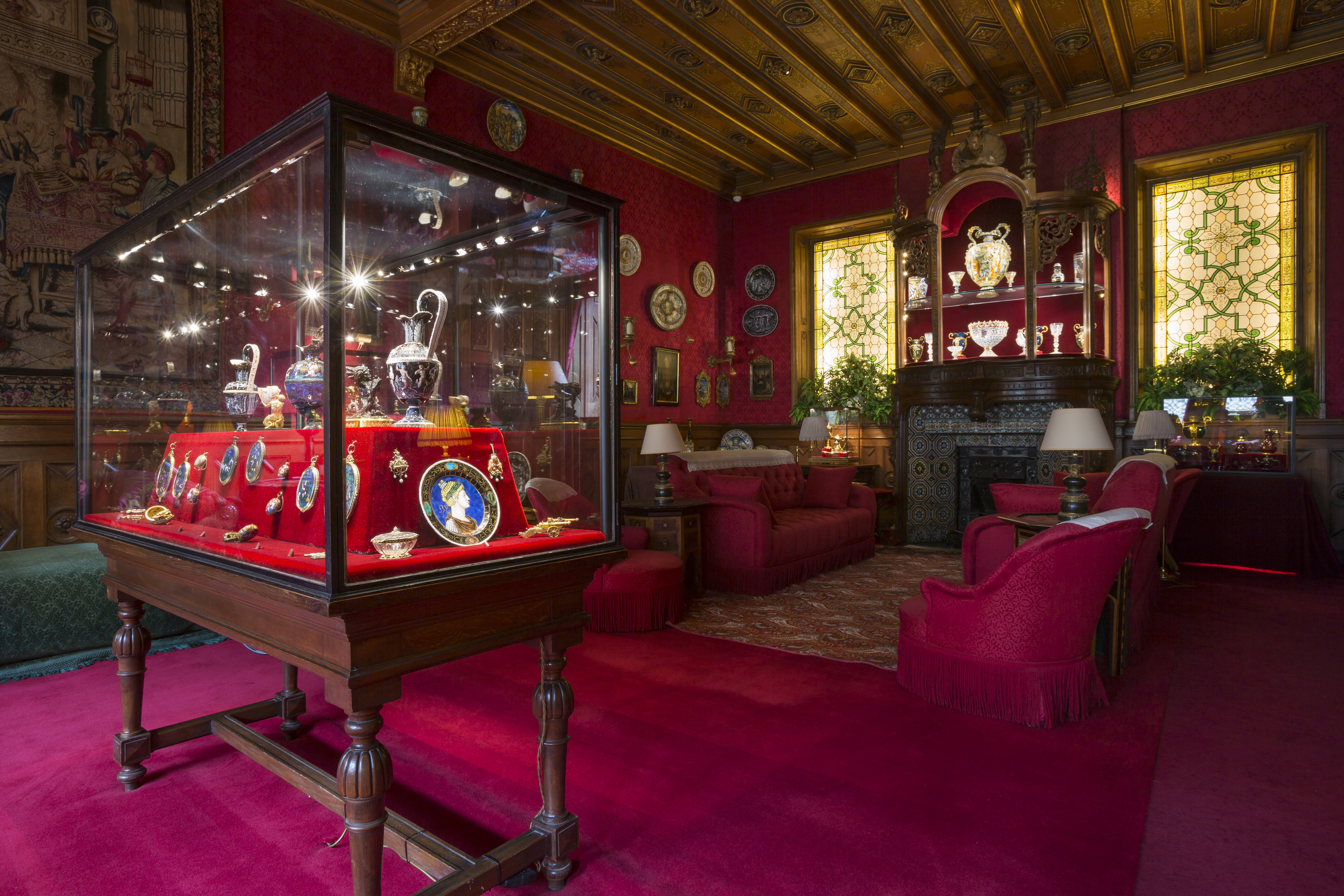
The Smoking Room at Waddesdon Manor, original home of the collection

The New Smoking Room built to hold the collection was only planned in 1891, and the collection was moved in there in early 1896, less than three years before Ferdinand's death. Good photographs allow an appreciation of how the objects were displayed, in glassed cases and on open shelves around the walls, over doors, and over the small fireplace, which had an elaborate shelved chimneypiece in wood above. Several objects, including the Casket of Saint Valerie, were on tables away from the walls. Comfortable seating was plentiful, some upholstered with pieces from medieval vestments, and there were framed photographs and houseplants. The room is now refilled with objects from the same period though of somewhat different types, and visitors to Waddesdon Manor can see it from the doorway.

Baron Ferdinand Rothschild MP, about 1880

The room, with the adjoining Billiards Room, is the only reception room at Waddesdon Manor to follow the French Renaissance style of the exterior; the other rooms are in broadly 18th-century styles, and contain a magnificent collection of paintings and furniture centred on that century. The segregation of the collection was part of the concept of what has been called the "neo-Kunstkammer", adopted by some other very wealthy collectors of the period. The Renaissance Room at what is now the Wallace Collection and the collection of Sir Julius Wernher were other examples formed in England over the same period. The neo-Kunstkammer aimed to emulate the collections formed during the Renaissance itself, mostly by princely houses; of these the outstanding survivals were the Habsburg collections in Vienna, Prague and Ambras, as well as the treasuries of the Green Vault in Dresden, the Munich Residenz and Kassel. Unlike those collections, contemporary and recent objects were not included.

Baron Ferdinand was a restless and, by his own account, unhappy man, whose life was blighted by the death of his wife after giving birth to their only child, who was stillborn; this was in 1866. Thereafter he lived with his unmarried sister Alice. As well as filling positions in local public life, he was Liberal MP for Aylesbury from 1885 until his death, and from 1896 a Trustee of the British Museum, probably at the instigation of Sir Augustus Wollaston Franks.

Ferdinand recognized and welcomed the drift of high quality art into public collections, which had begun in earnest during his time as a collector. While most of his assets and collections were left to his sister Alice, the collection now forming the Bequest and, separately, a group of 15 manuscripts now in the British Library, were left to the British Museum. He had already donated some significant objects to the museum in his lifetime, which are not counted in the Bequest.

Baron Ferdinand's bequest was most specific, and failure to observe the terms would make it void. It stated that the collection should be

placed in a special room to be called the Waddesdon Bequest Room separate and apart from the other contents of the Museum and thenceforth for ever thereafter, keep the same in such room or in some other room to be substituted for it.

These terms are still observed, and until late 2014 the collection was shown in the rather small room 45, in a display opened in 1973. In 2015 the Bequest was moved to Room 2A, a new, larger gallery on the ground floor, close to the main entrance on Museum Street. Until the Chinese ceramics collection of the Percival David Foundation moved to the British Museum the Waddesdon Bequest was the only collection segregated in this way.

== Renaissance metalwork ==
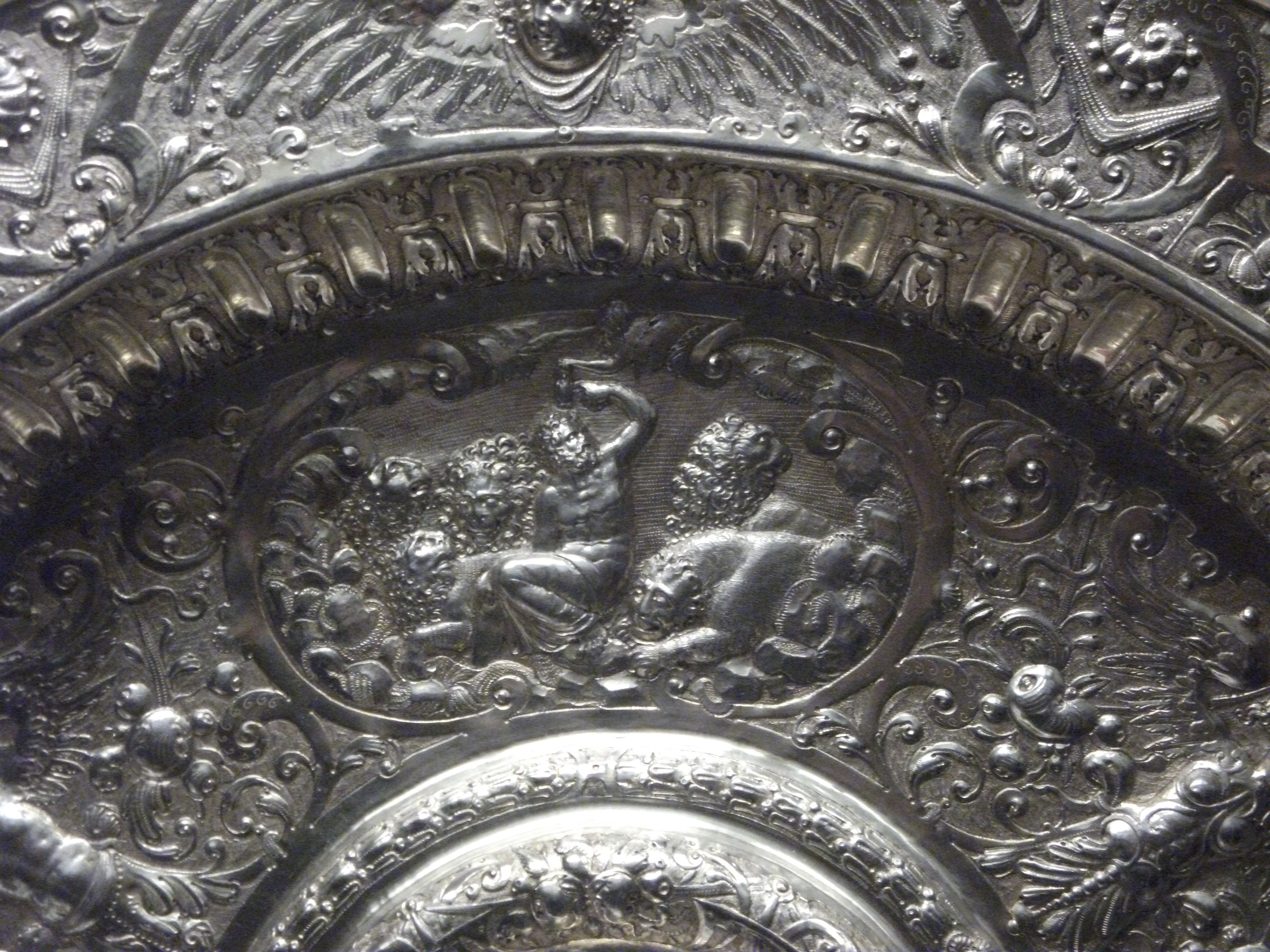
Detail of a basin

Much of the collection consists of luxury objects from the 16th century. Large pieces of metalwork in silver or silver-gilt make an immediate impression in the display, and these were designed to dazzle and impress guests when used at table, or displayed in rows on a sideboard with shelves like a modern bookcase or Welsh dresser. Many are very heavily decorated in virtuoso displays of goldsmiths' technique; rather too heavily for conventional modern taste. They are certainly ostentatious objects designed to display the wealth of their owner, and in many cases were designed to be appreciated when held in the hand, rather than seen under glass.

There are a number of standing cups with a cover, many from Augsburg and Nuremberg; these were used to drink a toast from to welcome a guest, and were also a common gift presented in politics and diplomacy, and by cities to distinguished visitors. Their decoration sometimes reflected the latest taste, often drawing from designs made as prints and circulated around Europe, but there was also often a very conservative continuation of late Gothic styles, which persisted until they came to be part of a Neugotic ("Neo-Gothic") revival in the early 17th century. The largest object in the bequest with a specifically Jewish connection is a silver-gilt standing cup made in Nuremberg about 1600, but by 1740 belonging to a Jewish burial society in Bratislava, as a Hebrew language inscription records.

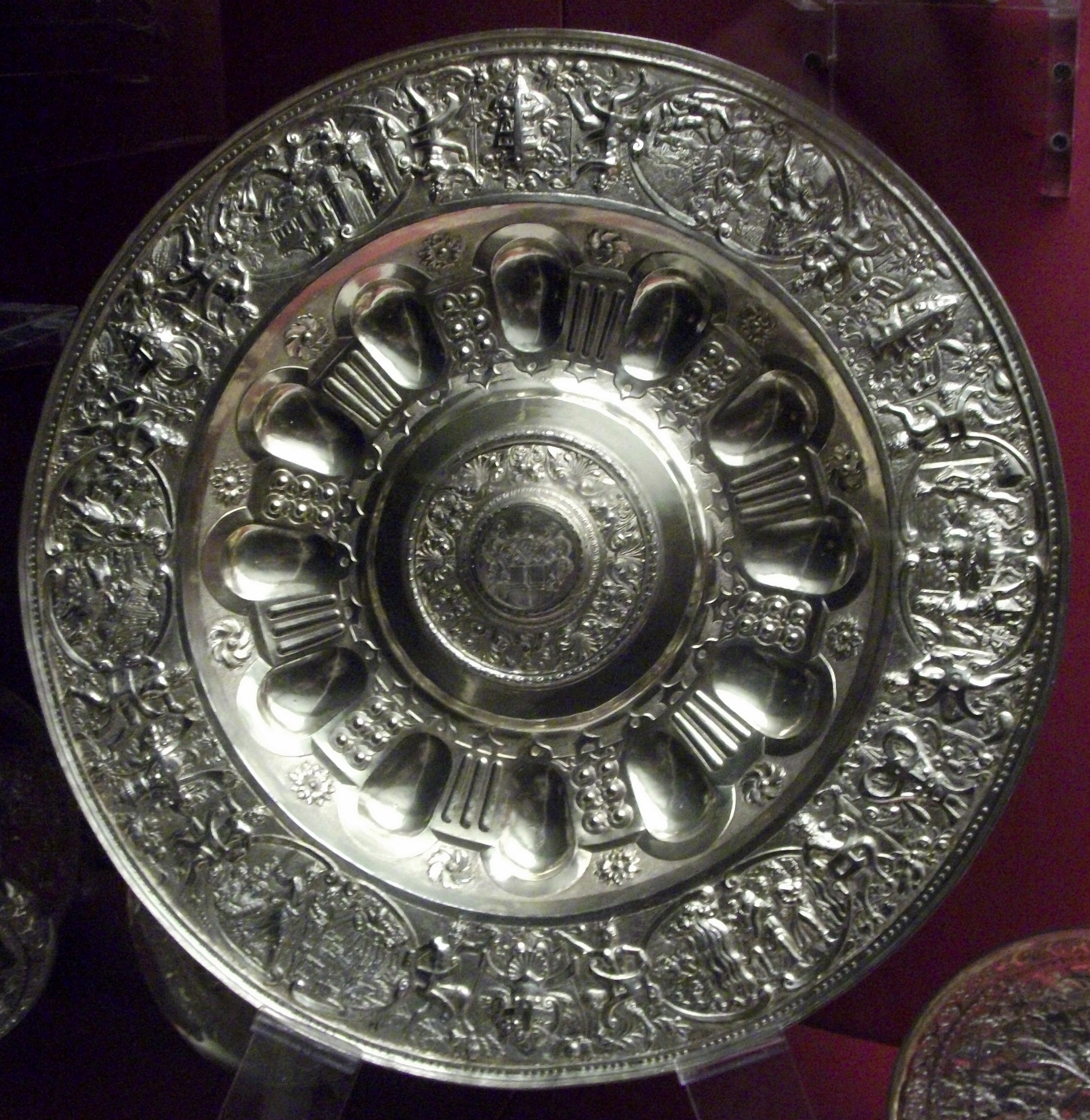
The Aspremont-Lynden basin, Antwerp, 1546–47

Apart from pieces purely in metal, a number are centred on either hardstone carvings or organic objects such as horns, seashells, ostrich eggshells, and exotic plant seeds. These "curiosities" are typical of the taste of the Renaissance Age of Discovery and show the schatzkammer and the cabinet of curiosities overlapping. A different form of novelty is represented by a table-ornament of a silver-gilt foot-high figure of a huntsman with a dog and brandishing a spear. There is a clockwork mechanism in his base which propels him along the table, and his head lifts off to show a cup, and he would have been used in drinking games. There are separate figures of a boar and stags for him to pursue, though not making a set; these can also function as cups.

One of the most important objects in the collection is the Ghisi Shield, a parade shield never intended for use in battle, made by Giorgio Ghisi, who was both a goldsmith and an important printmaker. It is signed and dated 1554. With a sword hilt, dated 1570 and now in at the Hungarian National Museum in Budapest, this is the only surviving damascened metalwork by Ghisi. The shield is made of iron hammered in relief, then damascened with gold and partly plated with silver. It has an intricate design with a scene of battling horseman in the centre, within a frame, around which are four further frames containing allegorical female figures, the frames themselves incorporating minute and crowded subjects on a much smaller scale from the Iliad and ancient mythology, inlaid in gold.

Other major pieces are sets of a ewer and basin, basin in this context meaning a large dish or salver, which when used were carried round by pairs of servants for guests to wash their hands without leaving the table. However the examples in the collection were probably hardly ever used for this, but were intended purely for display on sideboards; typically the basins are rather shallow for actual use. These were perhaps the grandest type of plate, with large surfaces where Mannerist inventiveness could run riot in the decoration. They were already expensive because of the weight of the precious metal, to which a huge amount of time by highly skilled silversmiths was added. The Aspremont-Lynden set in the bequest is documented in that family back to 1610, some 65 years after it was made in Antwerp, and weighs a little less than five kilos.

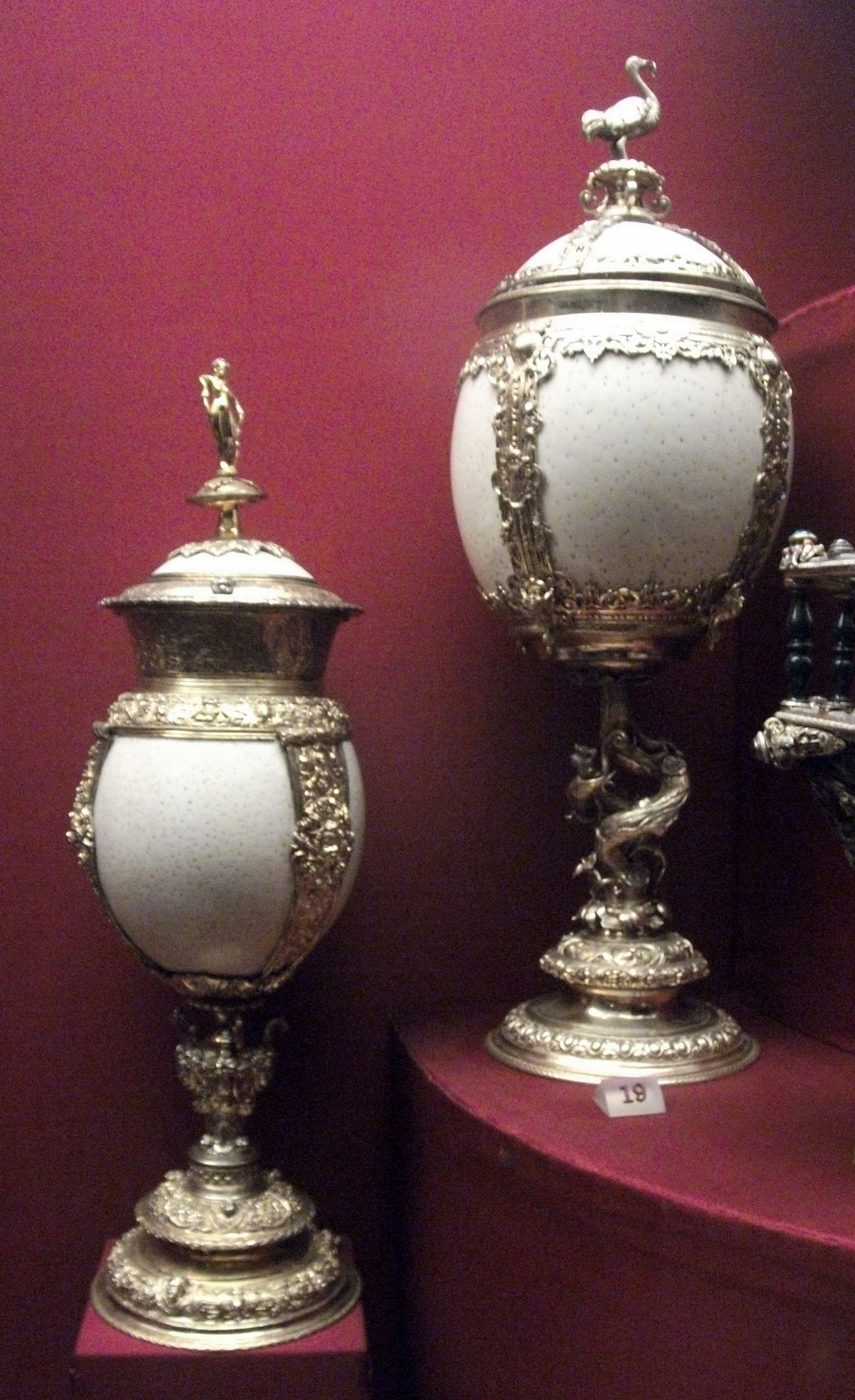
Two tall covered cups of ostrich eggs with mounts in silver-gilt

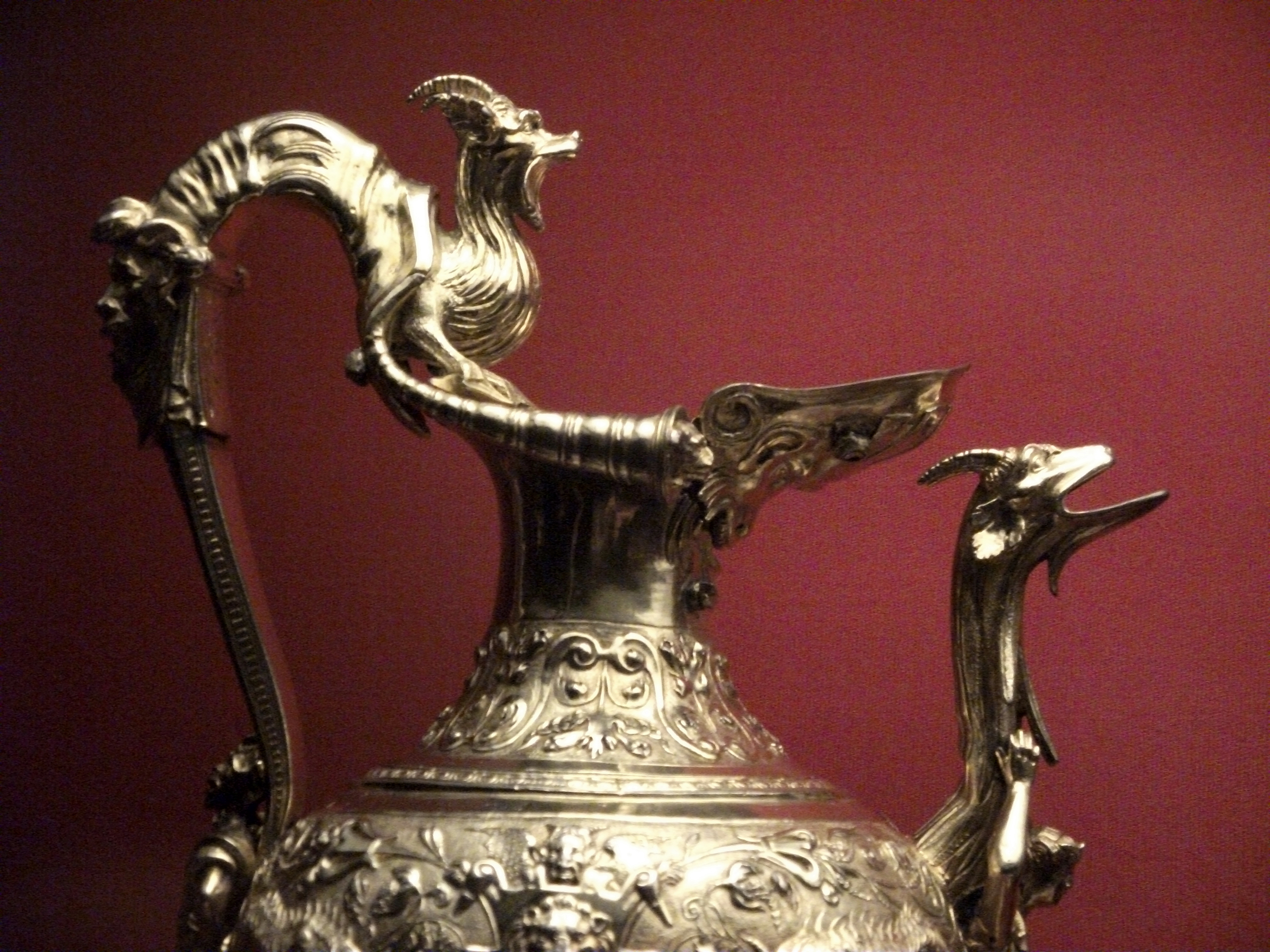
Top of the silver-gilt Aspremont-Lynden ewer, WB.89, Antwerp, mid-16th-century

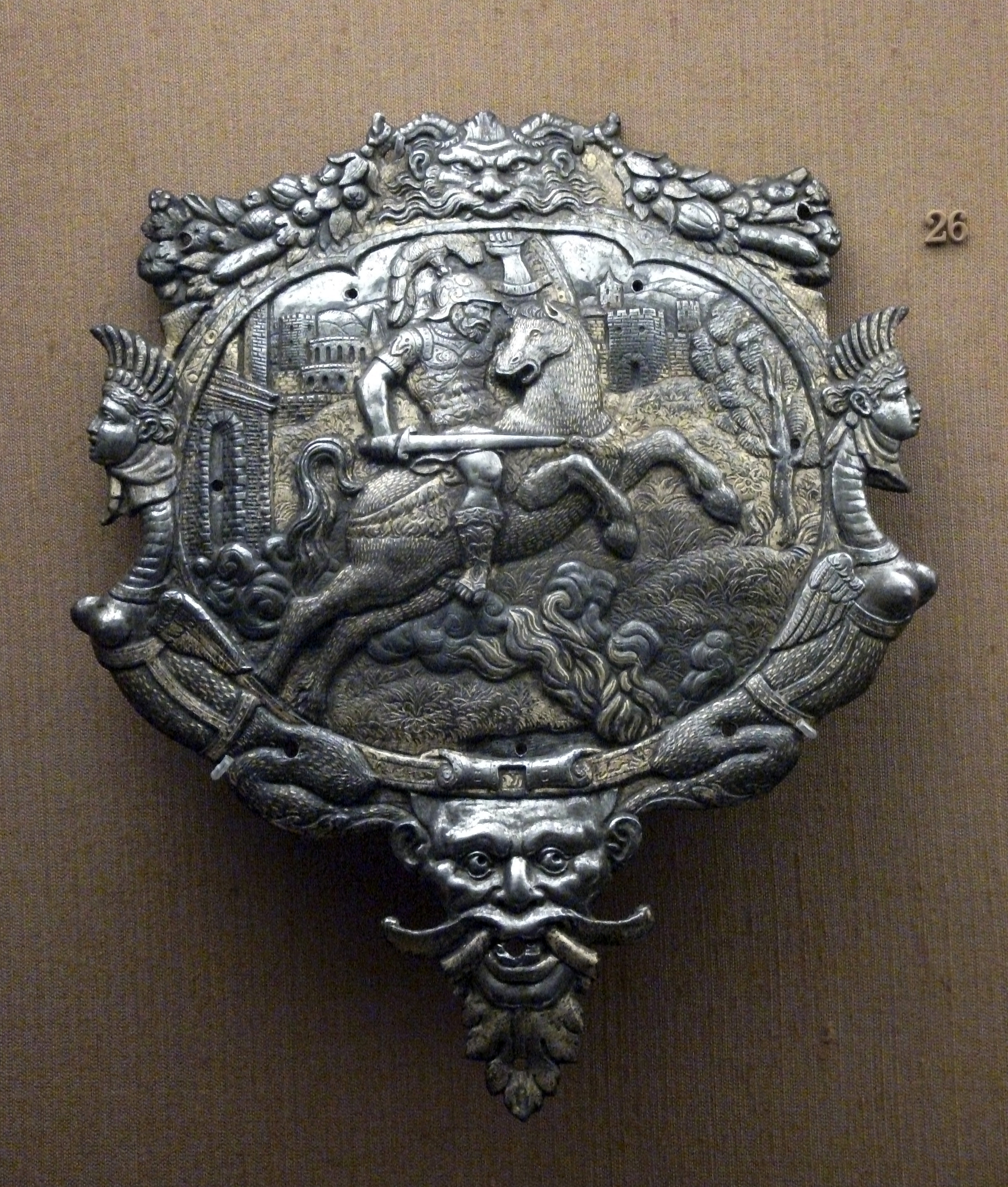
Damascened iron plaque for a barding, showing Marcus Curtius, WB.15, Milan, 1560–70

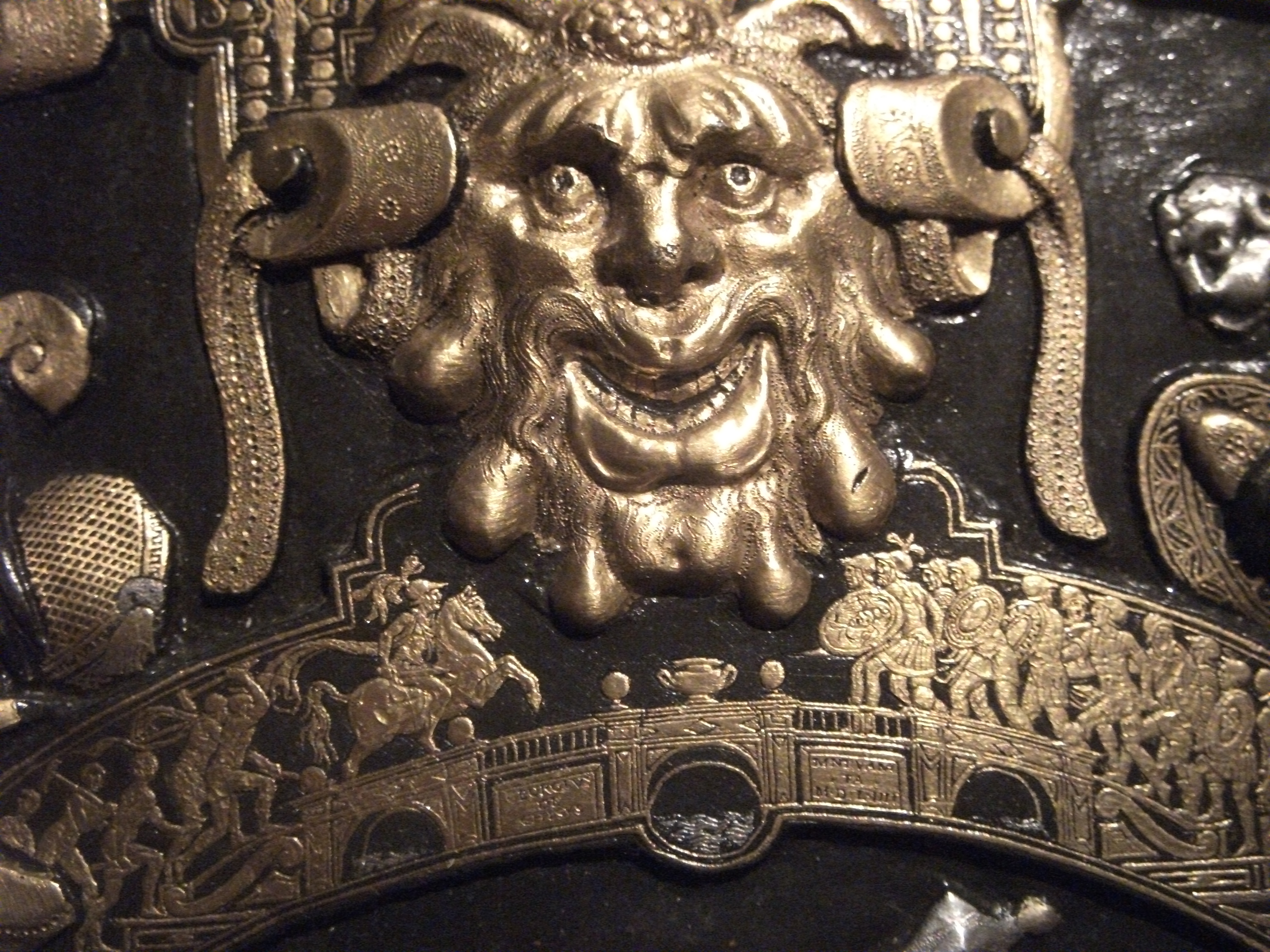
Detail from the Ghisi Shield; a grotesque head in the larger scale above Horatius at the bridge in the smaller

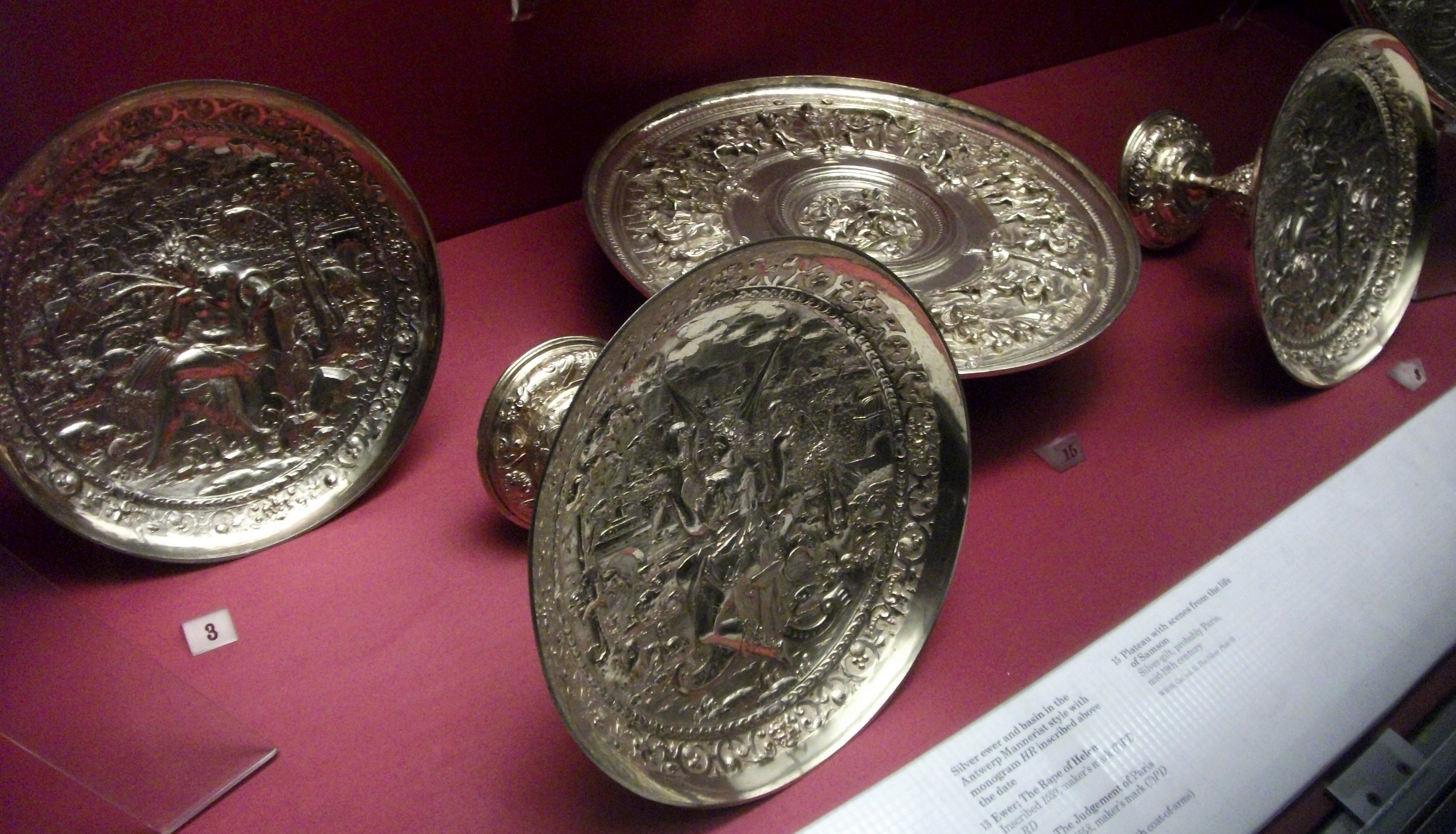
Part of a set of 12 silver-gilt tazze, Augsburg, end of 16th century

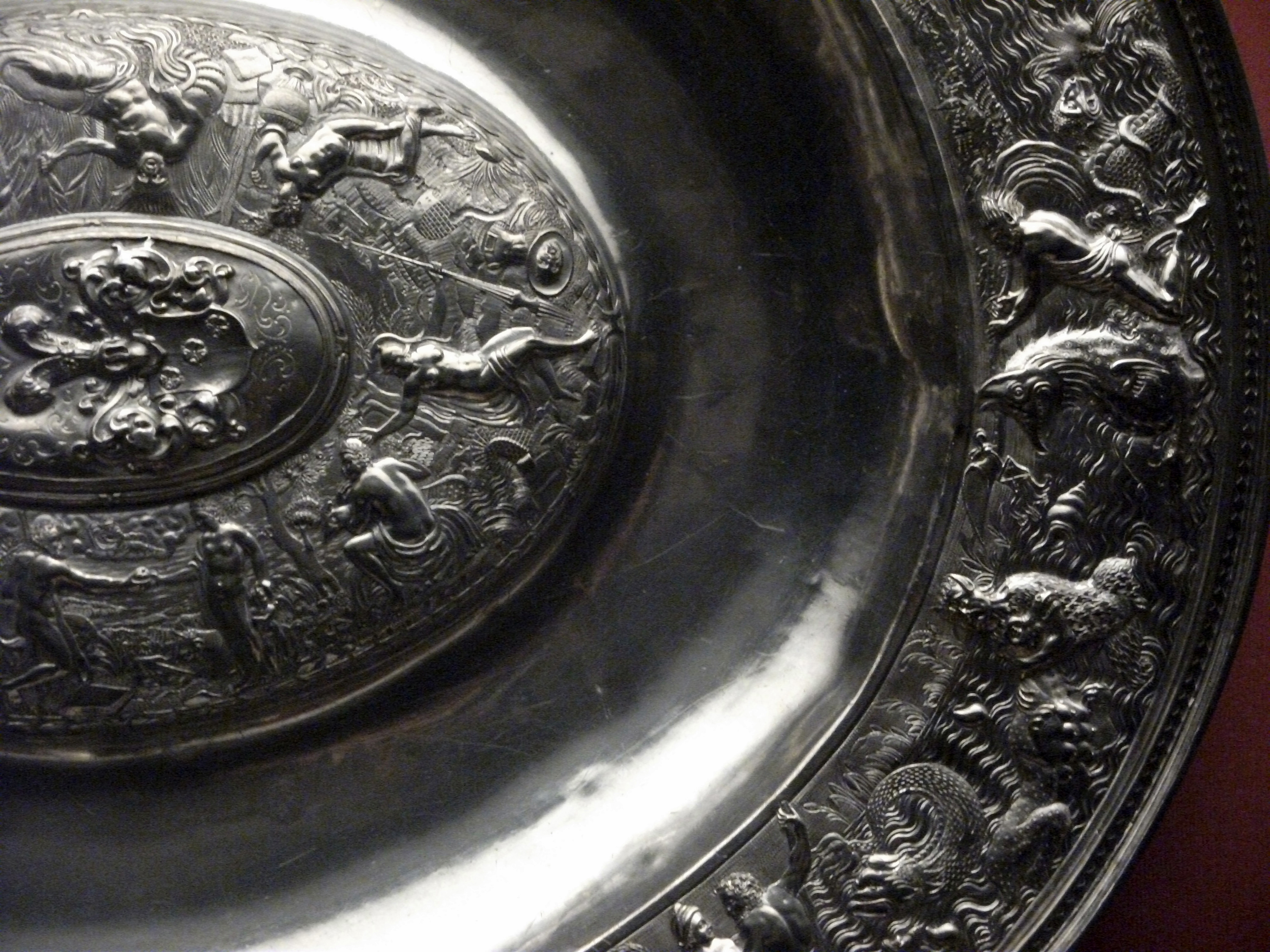
Olympian scenes on a basin

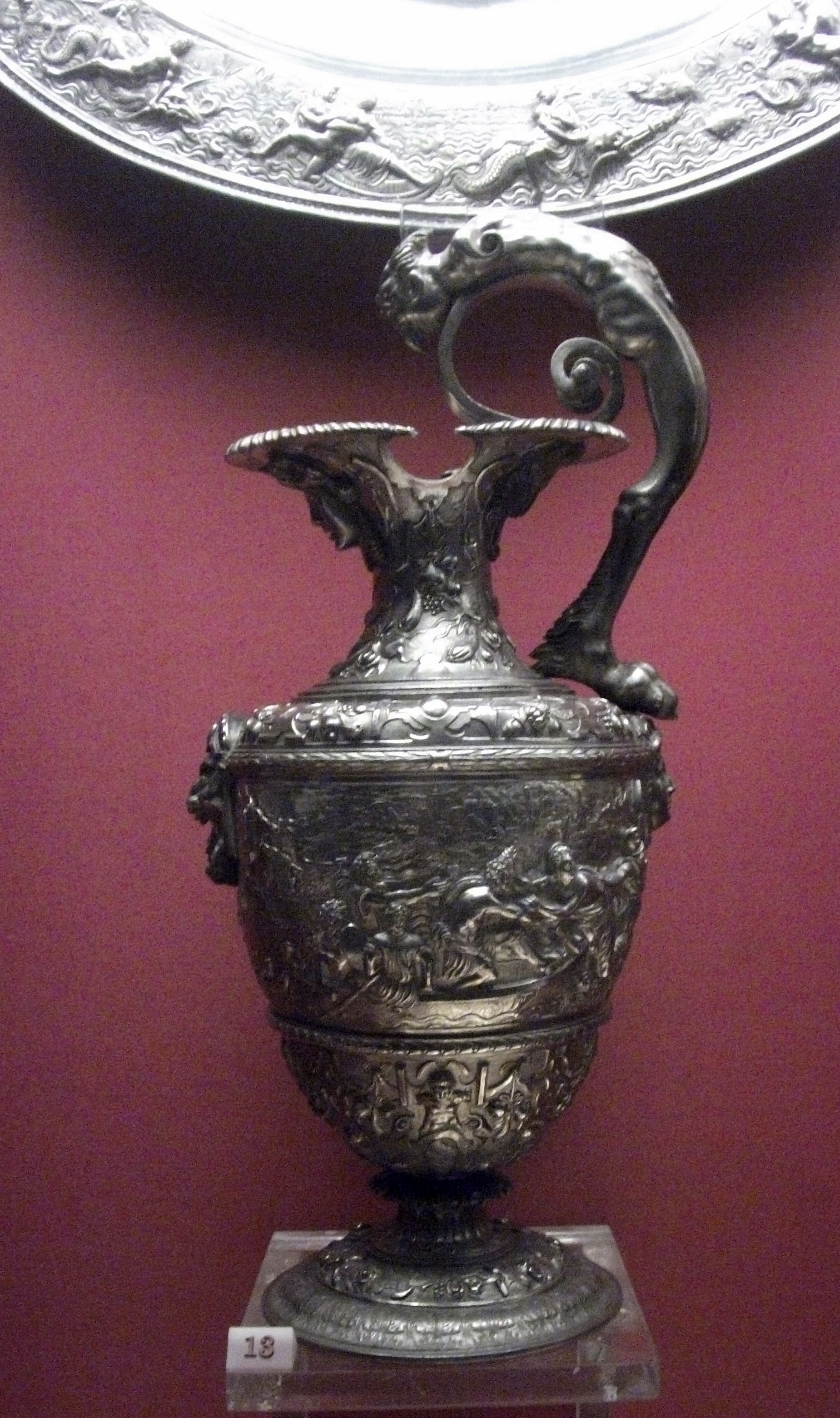
Ewer with its basin above, German, 1559

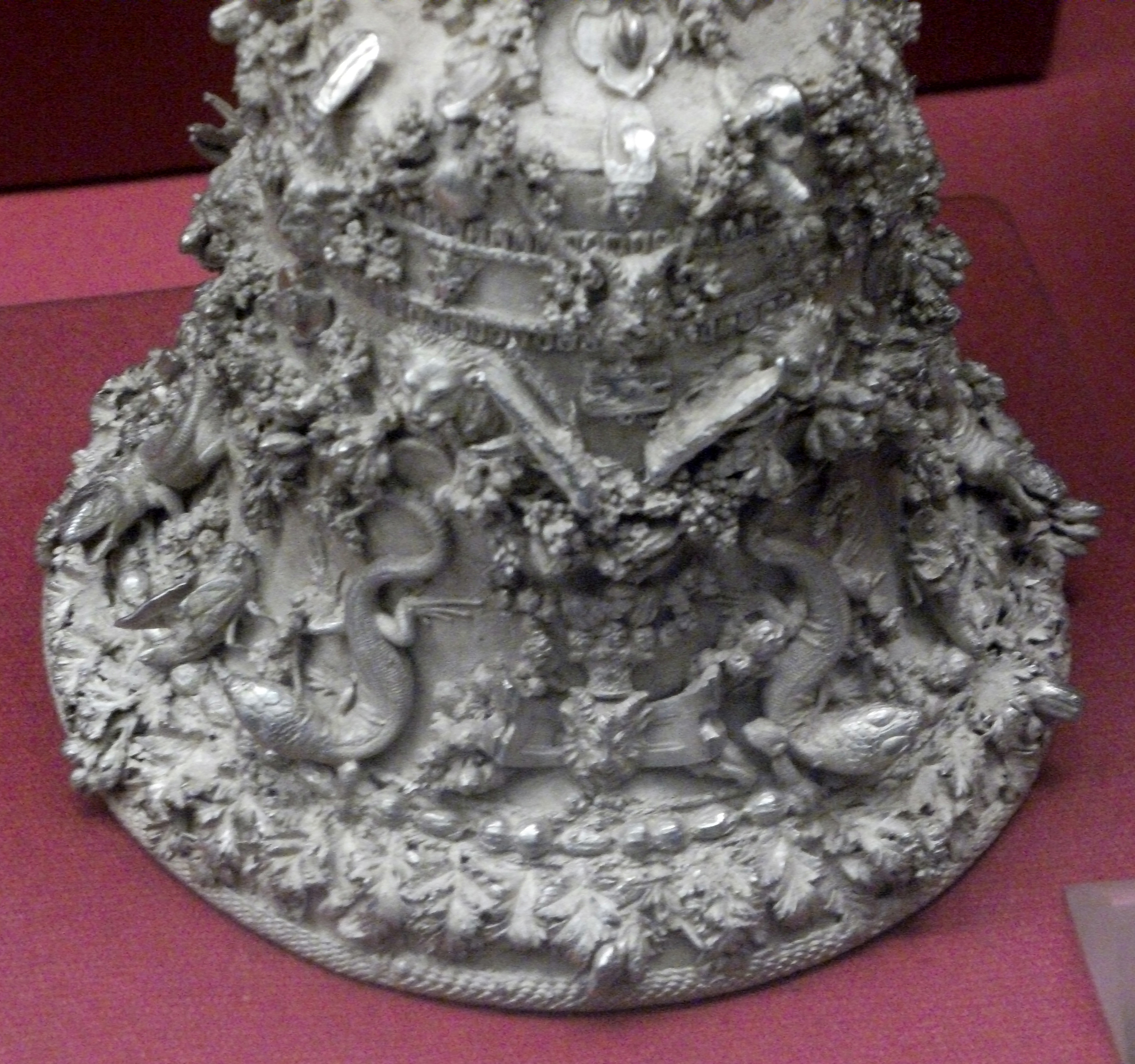
The bell by Wenzel Jamnitzer, once owned by Horace Walpole and discussed below

== Renaissance enamels ==
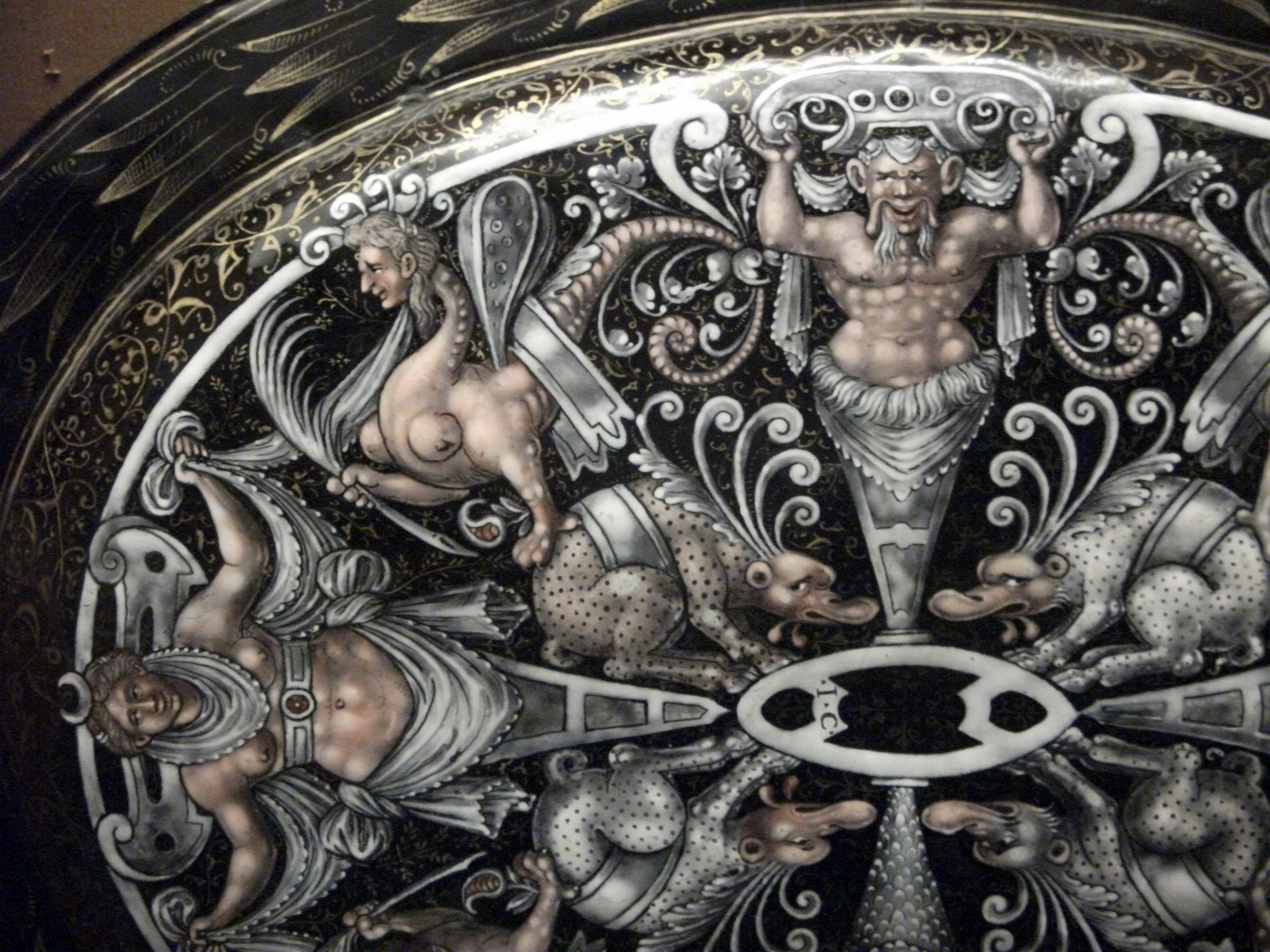
Detail of enamel dish, Limoges, mid-16th century, attributed to Jean de Court WB.33

Though the Waddesdon Bequest contains two very important medieval objects with enamel, and much of the jewellery and decorated cutlery uses enamel heavily, the great majority of the items that can be called "enamels" are in the French 16th-century style that was led by painted Limoges enamel, rather than the champlevé enamel for which Limoges was famous in the Romanesque period. The new technique produced pieces painted with highly detailed figurative scenes or decorative schemes. As with Italian maiolica, the imagery tended to be drawn from classical mythology or allegory, though the bequest includes some Old Testament scenes, and compositions were very often drawn from German, French or Italian prints. Enamels were produced in workshops which often persisted in the same family for several generations, and are often signed in the enamel, or identifiable, at least as far as the family or workshop, by punch marks on the back of panels, as well as by style. Leading artists represented in the collection include Suzanne de Court, Pierre Reymond, Jean de Court, Pierre Courtois and Léonard Limousin.

Enamels were made as objects such as candlesticks, dishes, vessels and mirrors, and also as flat plaques to be included in other objects such as caskets. The collection includes all these types, with both unmounted plaques and caskets fitted with plaques. The jolly grotesques illustrated at right are on the reverse of a large dish whose main face shows a brightly coloured depiction of the Destruction of Pharaoh's army in the Red Sea. Both designs are closely paralleled, without being exactly copied, in pieces in other collections, notably one in the Metropolitan Museum of Art in New York. The designs are also based on prints, but adapted by the enamellers for their pieces.

The Casket of the Sibyls is an elaborate small locking casket with a framework of silver-gilt and gems, set with grisaille panels with touches of gold and flesh-tints. It represents the sophisticated court taste of about 1535, and was probably intended for a lady's jewels. Most such sets of enamel inserts have lost the settings they were intended for.

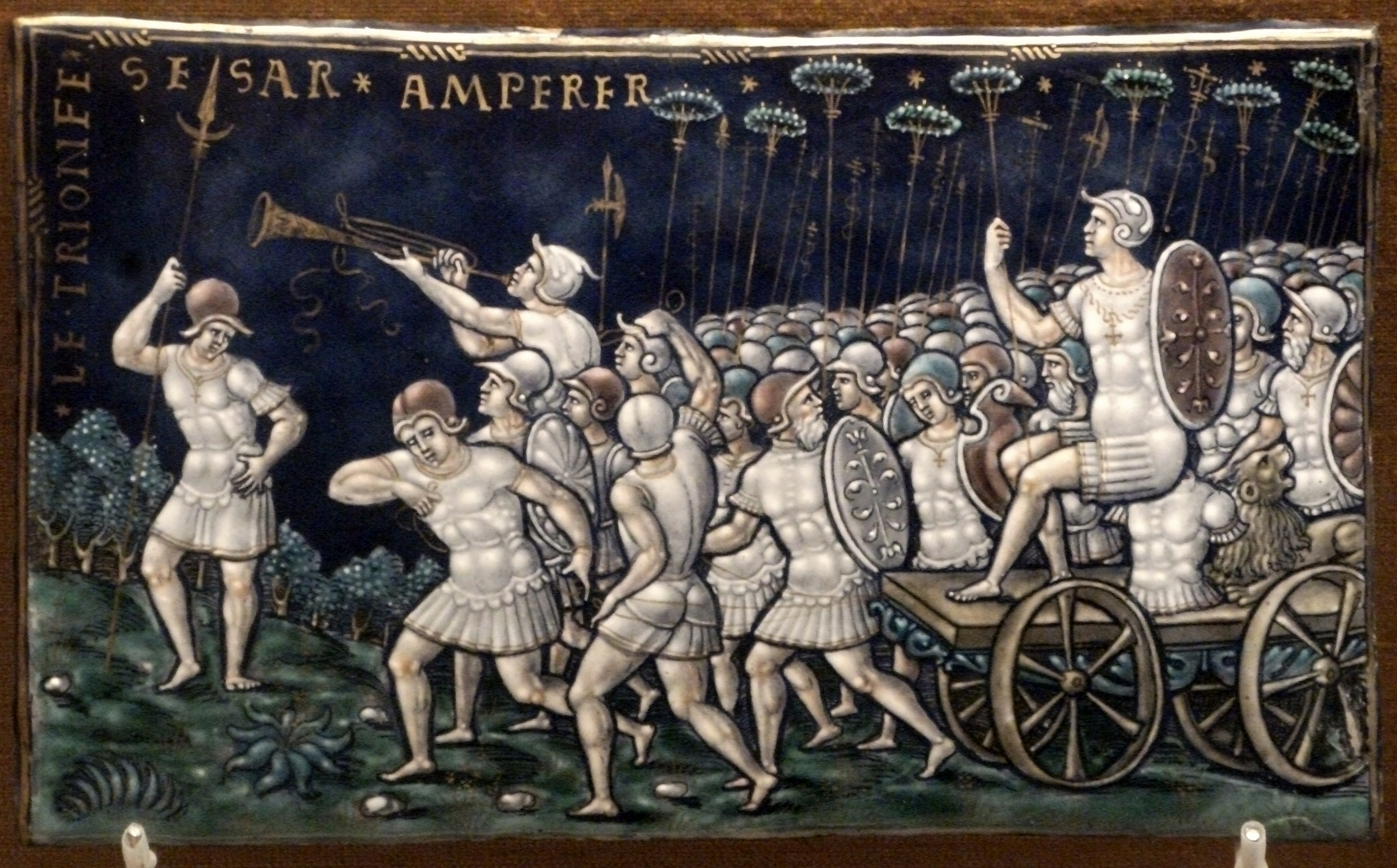
Triumph of Caesar, Limoges c. 1550, attributed to Pierre Reymond, one of a set

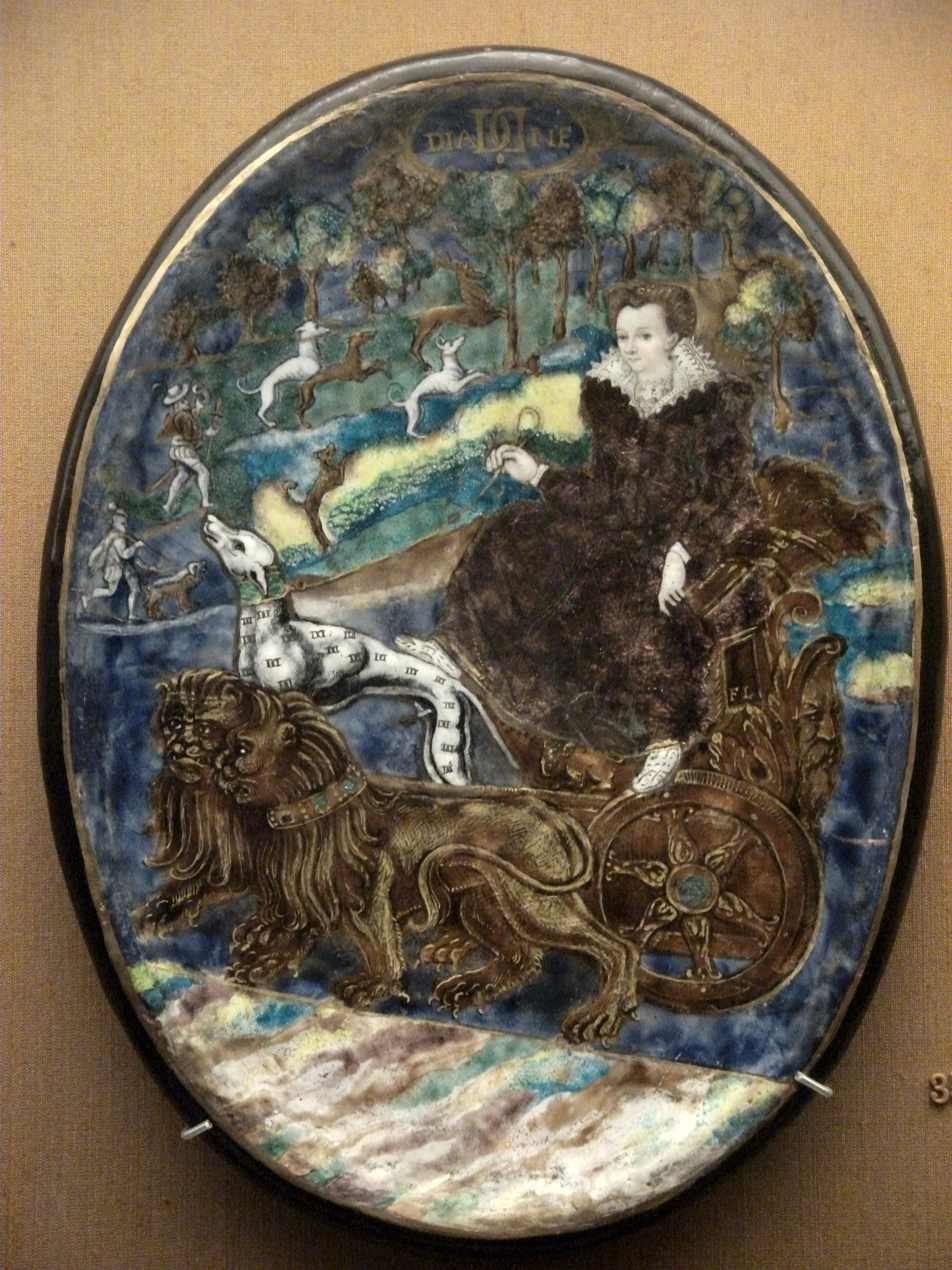
Diane de Poitiers, in a chariot drawn by lions, Limoges c. 1600, attributed to Francois Limousin, WB.39

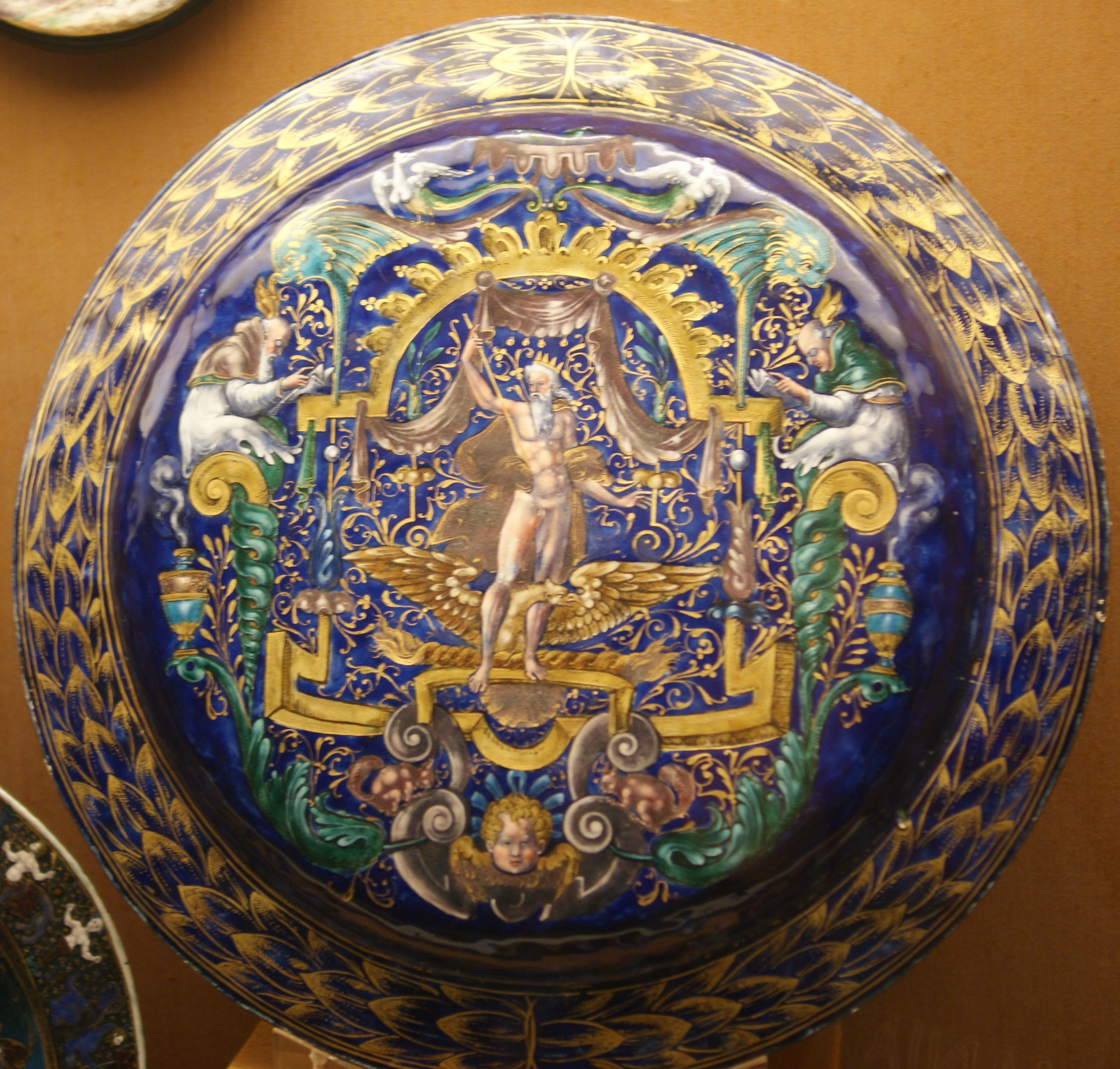
Jupiter, flanked by reading clerics with asses ears, rear of WB.30

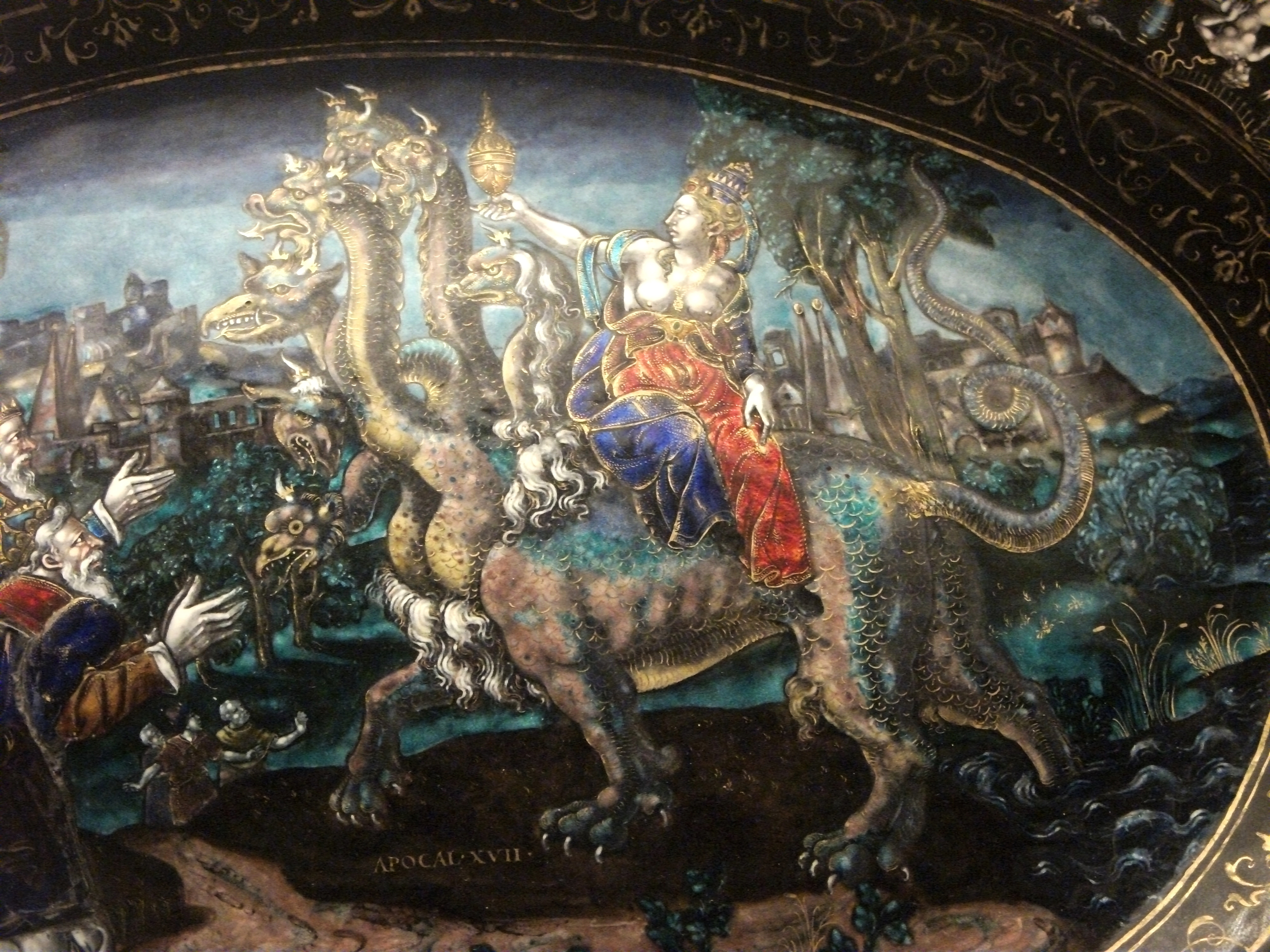
Detail of dish with scene from the Book of Revelation, Limoges c. 1580, attributed to Pierre Courtois

== Jewellery ==
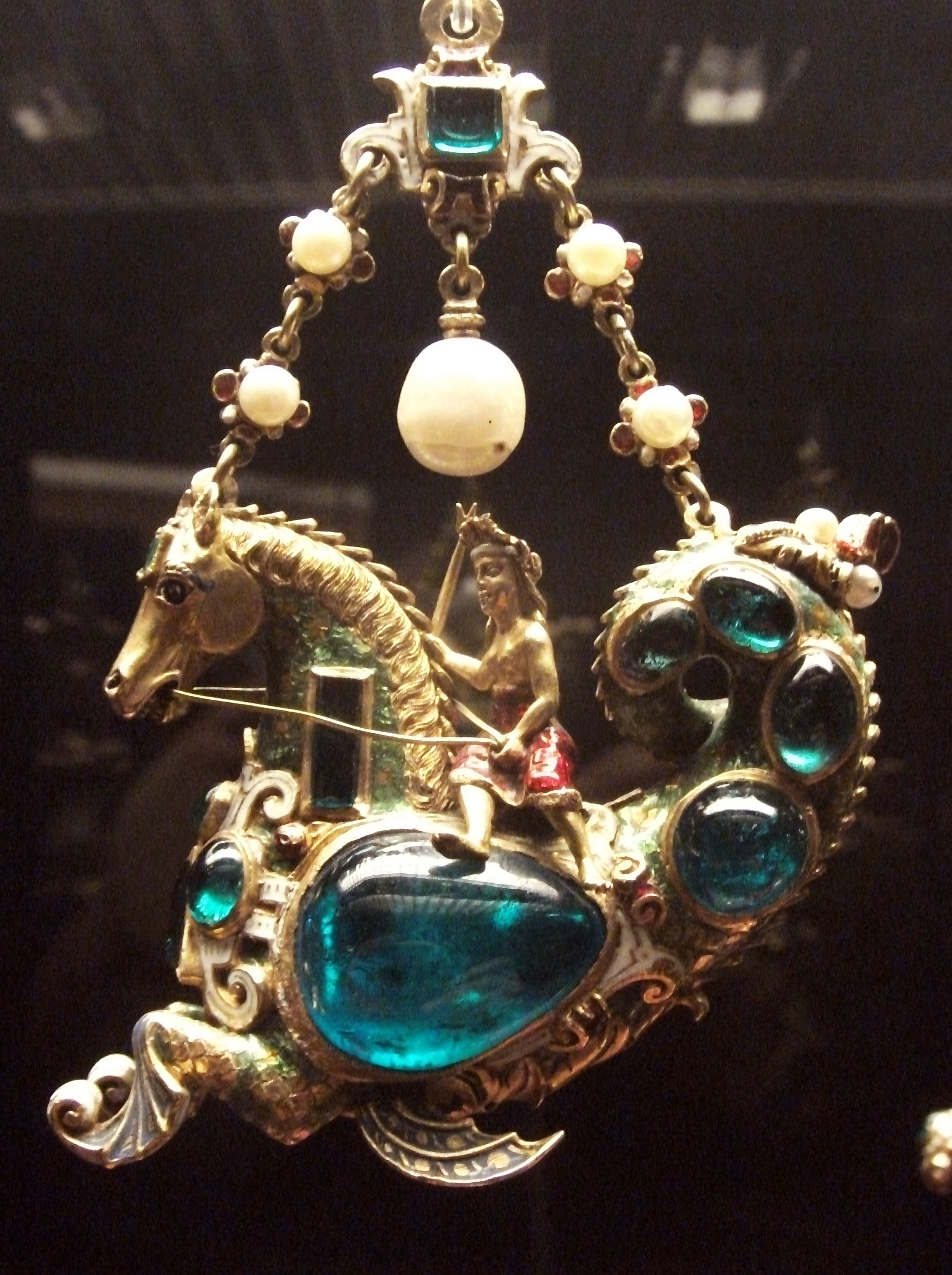
Pendant with mounted hippocamp, probably Paris, early 19th-century, WB.156

The emphasis of the jewellery is very firmly on spectacular badges and pendant jewels of the late Renaissance in what is known as the "Spanish Style" that was adopted throughout Europe between about 1550 and 1630, using gems together with gold and enamel to create dazzling tiny sculptures. These were originally worn by both men and women, but as a collection the Waddesdon group was chosen for display (and in a specifically male setting) rather than for wearing, except at the occasional fancy-dress ball, a fashion at the time. The group demonstrate little interest in gemstones and pearls for their own sake. Although such pieces have survived more often than styles emphasizing gem stones and massy gold, which were typically recycled for their materials when fashion changed, the demand from 19th-century collectors greatly exceeded the supply of authentic survivals, and many pieces include much work from that period (see below).

For many of the pieces though it is not easy to place the date or country of manufacture. There is no such difficulty with the most famous jewel in the collection, the Lyte Jewel, which was made in London and presented to Thomas Lyte of Lytes Cary, Somerset in 1610 by King James I of England, who loved large jewels, and giving them to others. Lyte was not a regular at court, but he had drawn up a family tree tracing James's descent back to the legendary Trojan, Brut. The jewel contains a miniature portrait of the king by Nicholas Hilliard, though for conservation reasons this is now removed from the jewel. Lyte wears the jewel in a portrait of 1611, showing a drop below the main oval set with three diamonds, which had gone before 1882. The front cover has an elaborate openwork design with James's monogram IR, while the back has very finely executed enamel decoration.

One pendant, shaped like a lantern with a tiny Crucifixion inside, was made in 16th-century Mexico, and from comparison with other pieces may originally have included Mexican feather work, a Pre-Columbian art whose craftspeople the Spanish missionaries employed in workshops for export luxury objects.

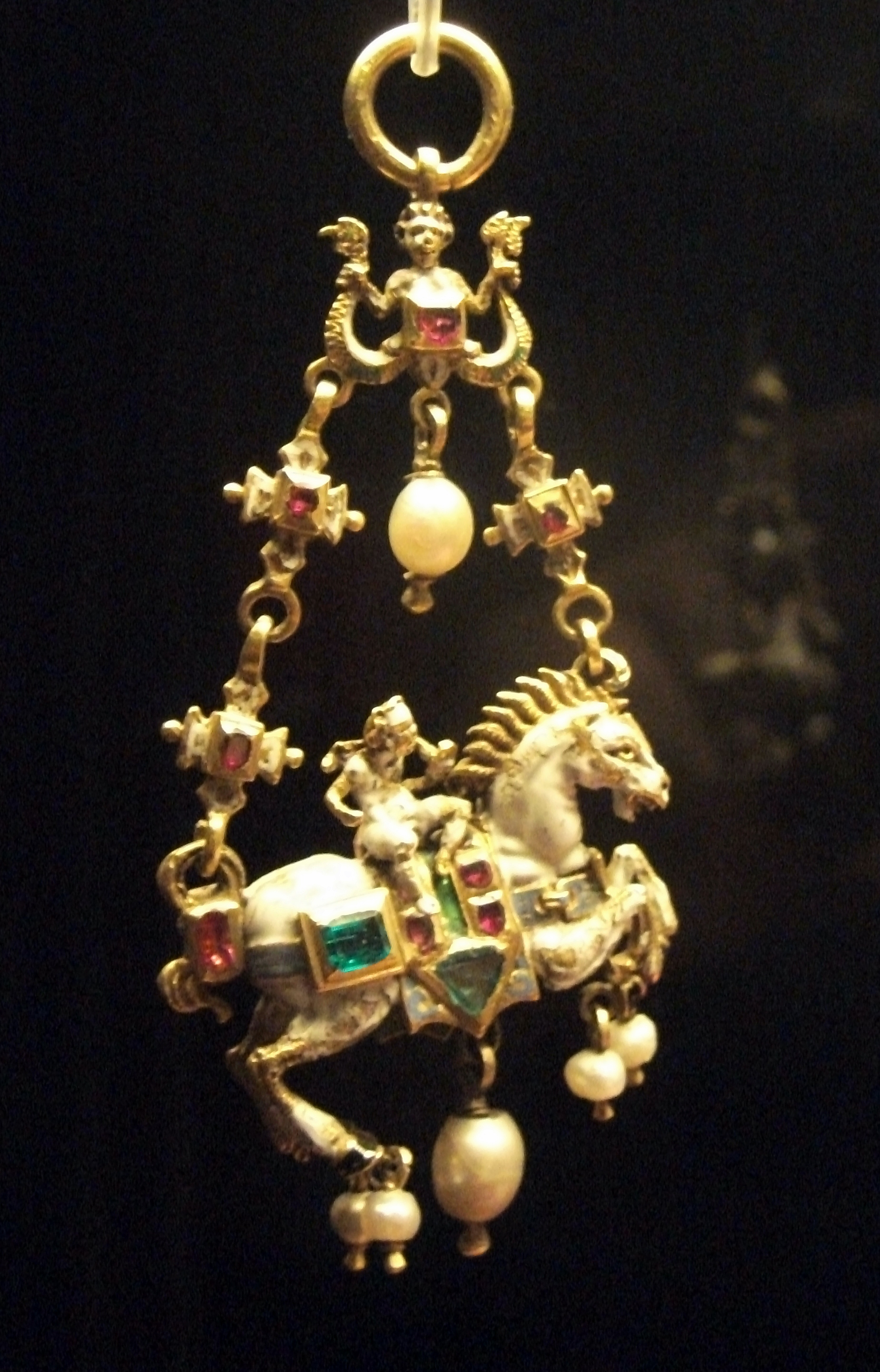
Pendant with mounted cupid, German, late 16th-century, WB.160

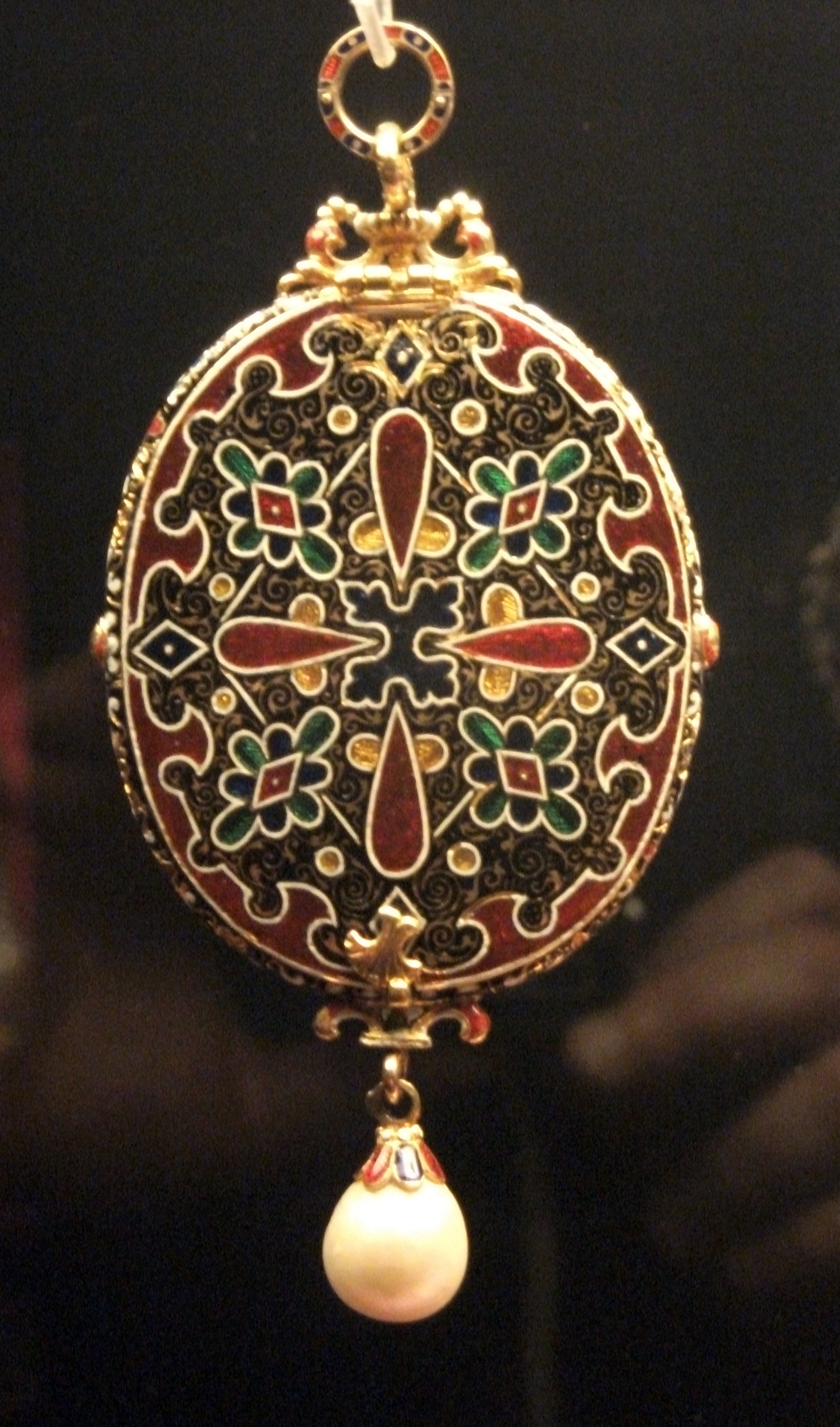
Enamelled cover of an English locket, 1630s, with miniature of the Royalist general Sir Bevil Grenville, WB.168

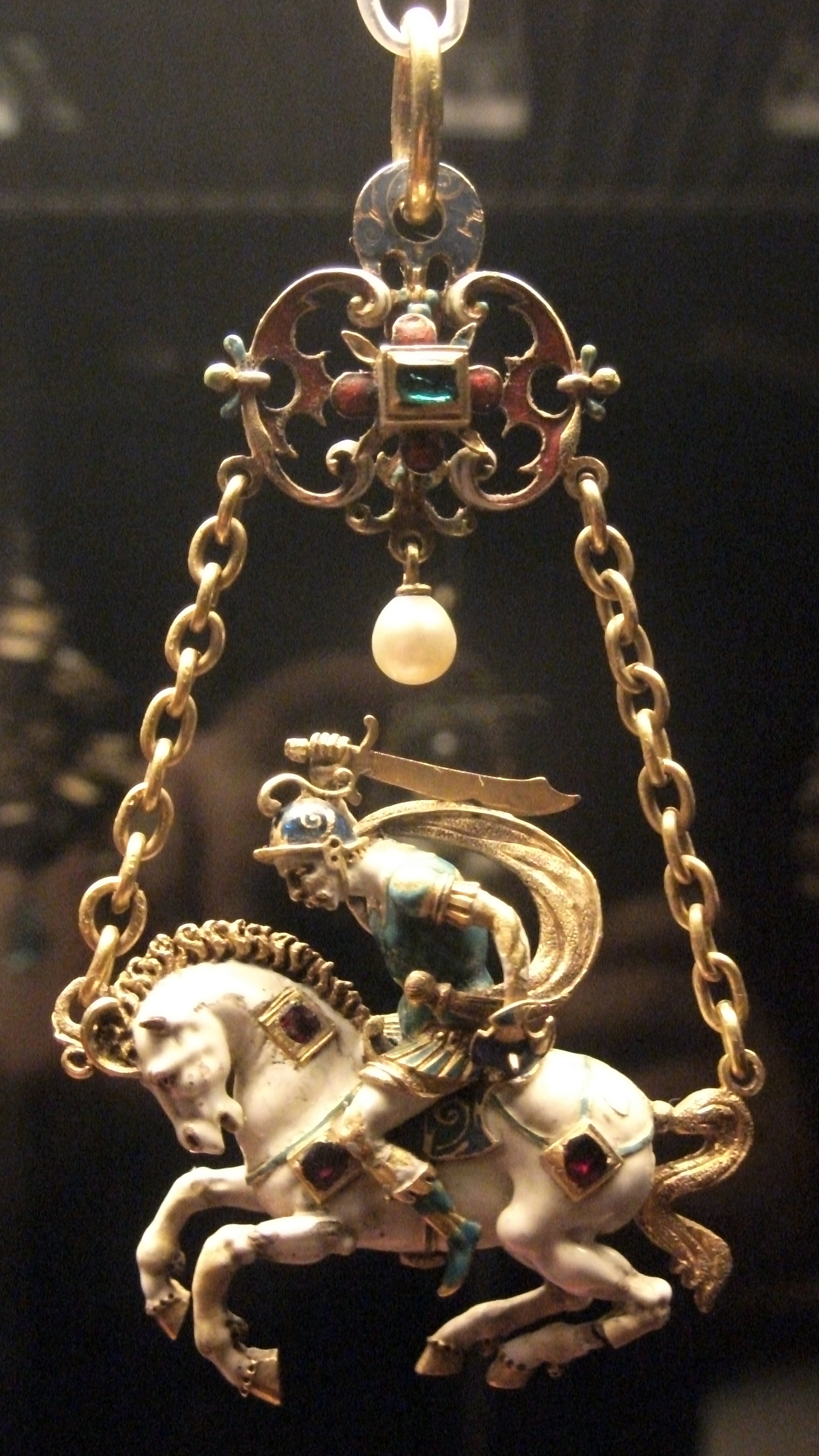
Pendant with mounted warrior, German, mid-16th century, WB.161

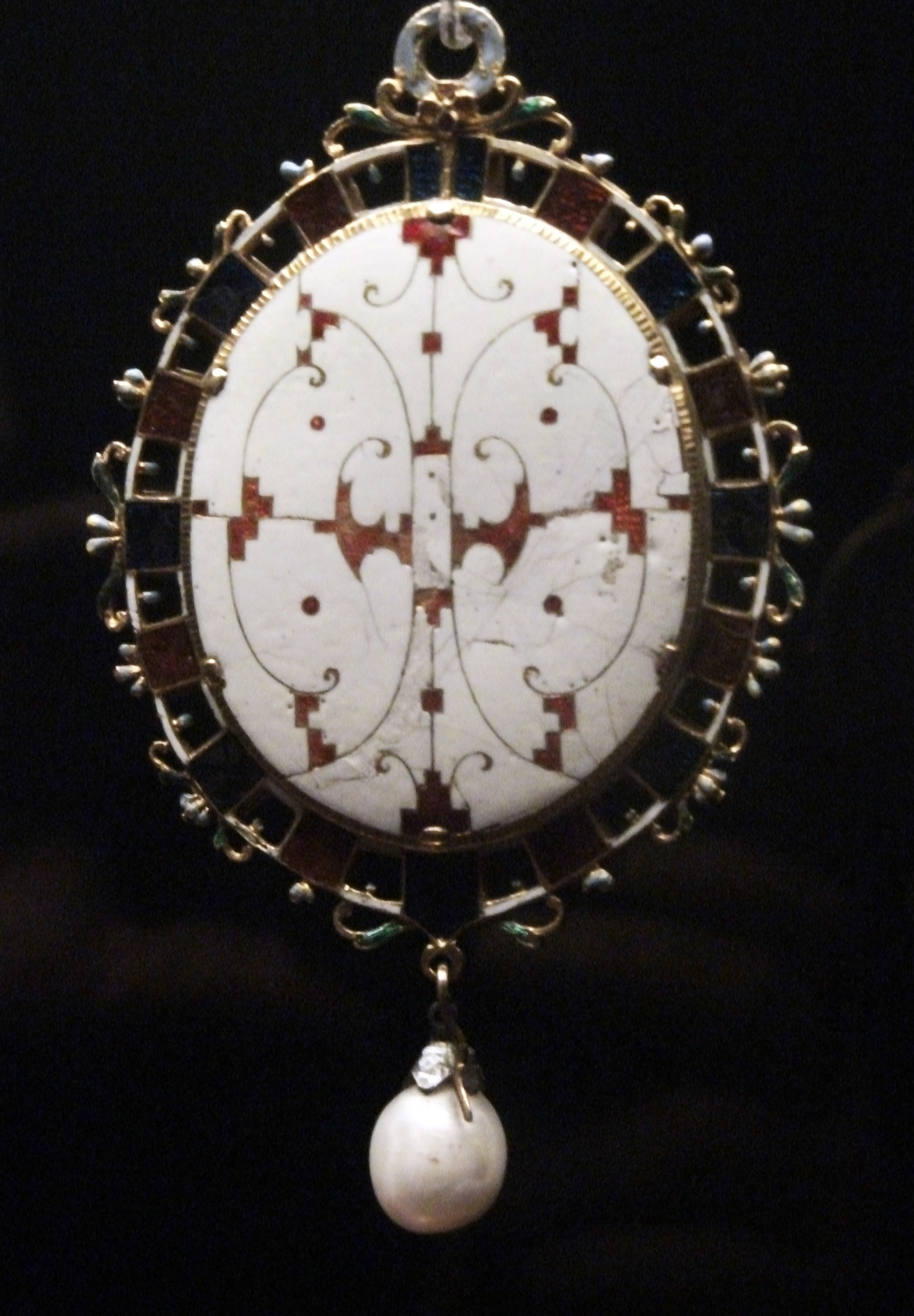
Back of the Lyte Jewel

== Objects from before the Renaissance ==
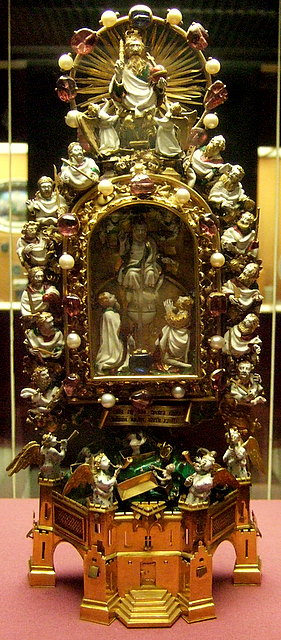
Holy Thorn Reliquary

The collection includes an eclectic group of objects of very high quality that predate the Renaissance. The oldest objects are a set of four Hellenistic bronze medallions with heads projecting in very high relief, and round handles hanging below. These date to the century before Christ, and came from a tomb in modern Turkey, and were fixtures for some wooden object, perhaps a chest. The heads are identified as Ariadne, Dionysus, Persephone and Pluto. The carved agate body of WB.68 may be late Roman, and is discussed below.

The Palmer Cup is an important early Islamic glass cup, made around 1200, in Syria or perhaps Egypt, and painted in enamels. In the same century it was given a silver-gilt and rock crystal stem and foot in France. Below a poetic Arabic inscription praising wine-drinking, a seated prince holding a cup or glass is flanked by five standing attendants, two playing castanets and the others holding weapons. As an early enamel-painted image the cup is extremely rare in Islamic glass, although similar images in Mina'i ware painted Persian pottery of the period are found. There are a handful of comparable early Islamic glass cups with enamel that have survived in old European collections, such as the Luck of Edenhall in the Victoria and Albert Museum, and others in the Green Vault in Dresden and the Louvre, and others are recorded in old inventories. Often these were given a new foot in metalwork in Europe, as here. There is also a large mosque lamp with enamelled decoration from the late 14th century.

Romanesque art is represented by an unusually large Limoges enamel reliquary in the common chasse shape, like a gabled house. This was made in about 1170 to hold relics of Saint Valerie of Limoges, a virgin-martyr of the Roman period who was the most important local saint of Limoges, a key centre for Romanesque champlevé enamel. Her highly visual story is told in several scenes that use a wide range of colours, with the rest of the front face decorated in the "vermicular" style, with the space between the figure filled with scrolling motifs on a gold background. According to legend, St Valerie was a cephalophore saint, who after she was beheaded carried her own head to give to her bishop, Saint Martial, who had converted her.

There are many more objects in a Gothic style, and as is typical for northern Europe several of these come from well into the 16th century, and should be considered as belonging to the Northern Renaissance. However the most important medieval object, and arguably the most important single piece in the collection, though from the late Gothic period, has nothing strictly Gothic in its style, and represents a very advanced court taste in this respect. This is the Holy Thorn Reliquary, which was probably created in the 1390s in Paris for the Valois prince John, Duke of Berry, to house a relic of the Crown of Thorns. It is one of a small number of major goldsmiths' works or joyaux that survive from the extravagant world of the courts of the Valois royal family around 1400. It is made of gold, lavishly decorated with jewels and pearls, and uses the technique of enamelling en ronde bosse, or "in the round", which had been recently developed when the reliquary was made, to create a total of 28 three-dimensional figures, mostly in white enamel.

In contrast, two highly elaborate metalwork covers for the treasure bindings of the Epistle and Gospel Books for the high altar of a large church, probably Ulm Minster, were made around 1506 but are full of spiky Gothic architectural details, although the many figures in high relief are on the verge of Renaissance style.

There are two German statues of saints in wood, about half life-size, from the decades around 1500, and a larger number of miniature boxwood carvings. These include "prayer nuts" of superb quality from around 1510 to 1530. These are small wooden "balls" which open up to reveal carvings of religious scenes that fit dozens of tiny figures into a space two or three inches across, and were a fashion among royalty and the wealthy; they were apparently made in the northern Netherlands. They seem to have often been suspended from belts, or formed part of a rosary; others still have copper carrying cases. A trick of technique in making them is that the main carved scene is made on a smaller hemisphere, allowing access from behind, which was then set into the main hemisphere.

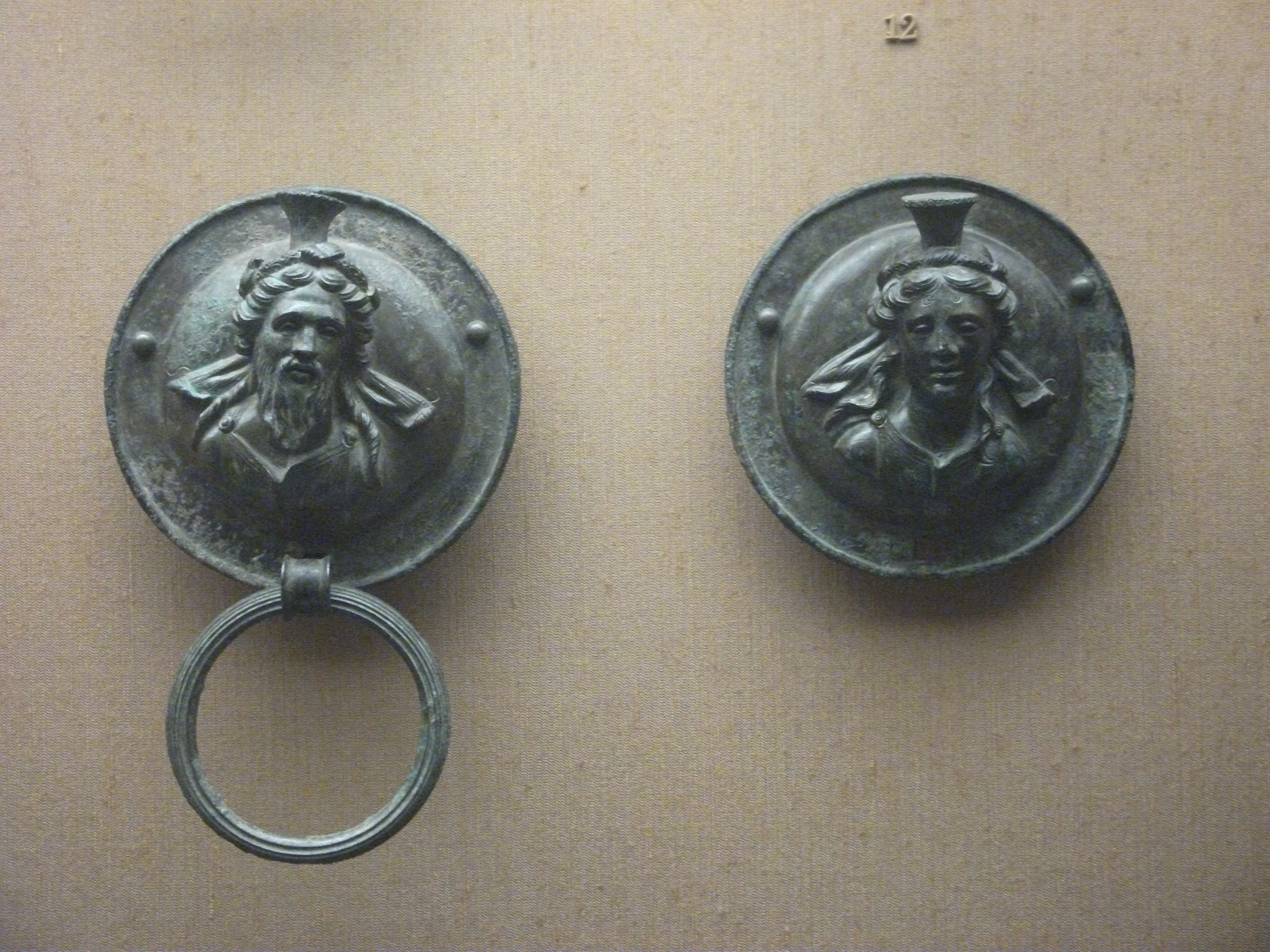
Hellenistic bronze fittings, with Pluto and Persephone

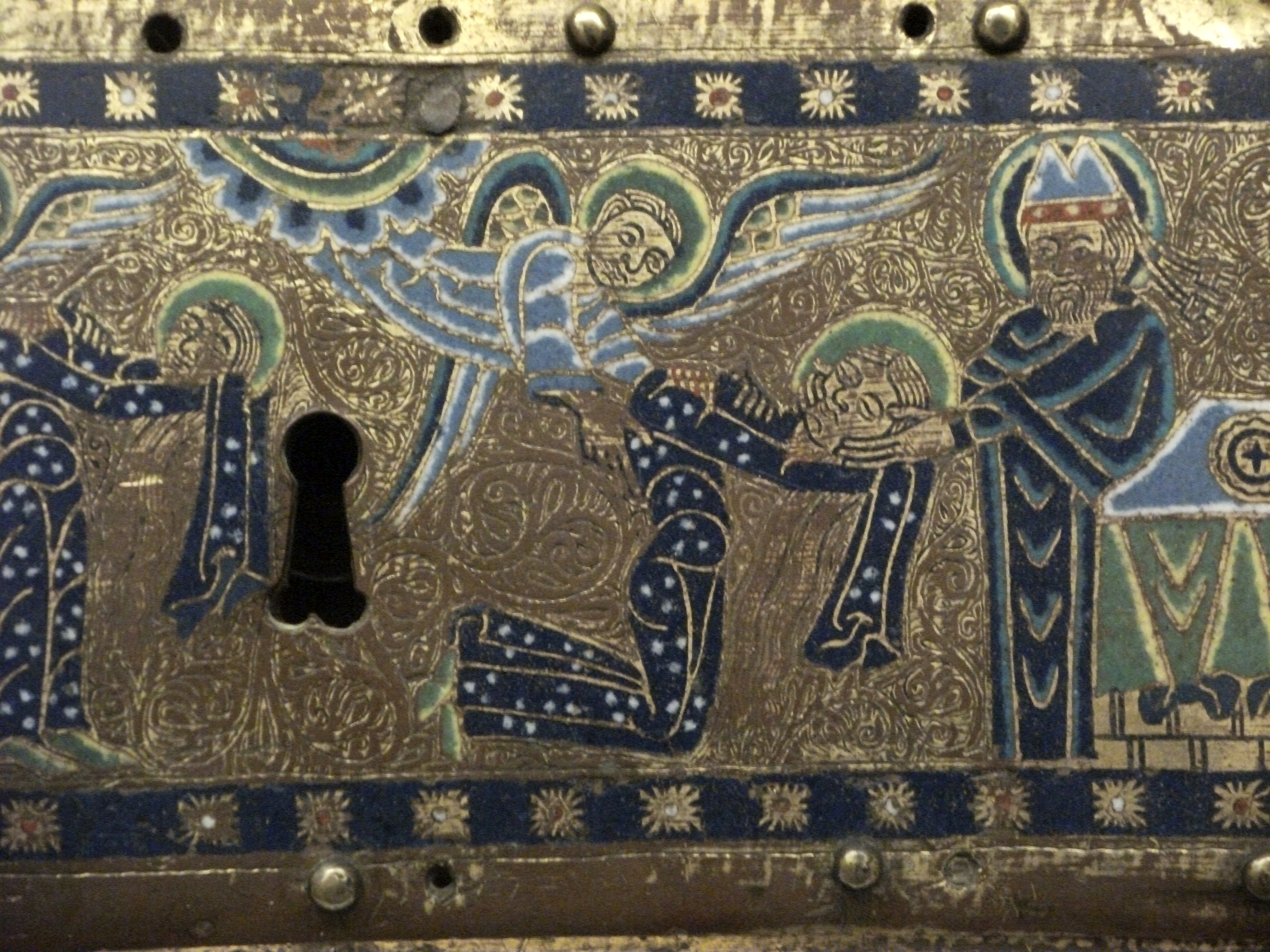
St Valerie as cephalophore, carrying her own head to her bishop, Saint Martial

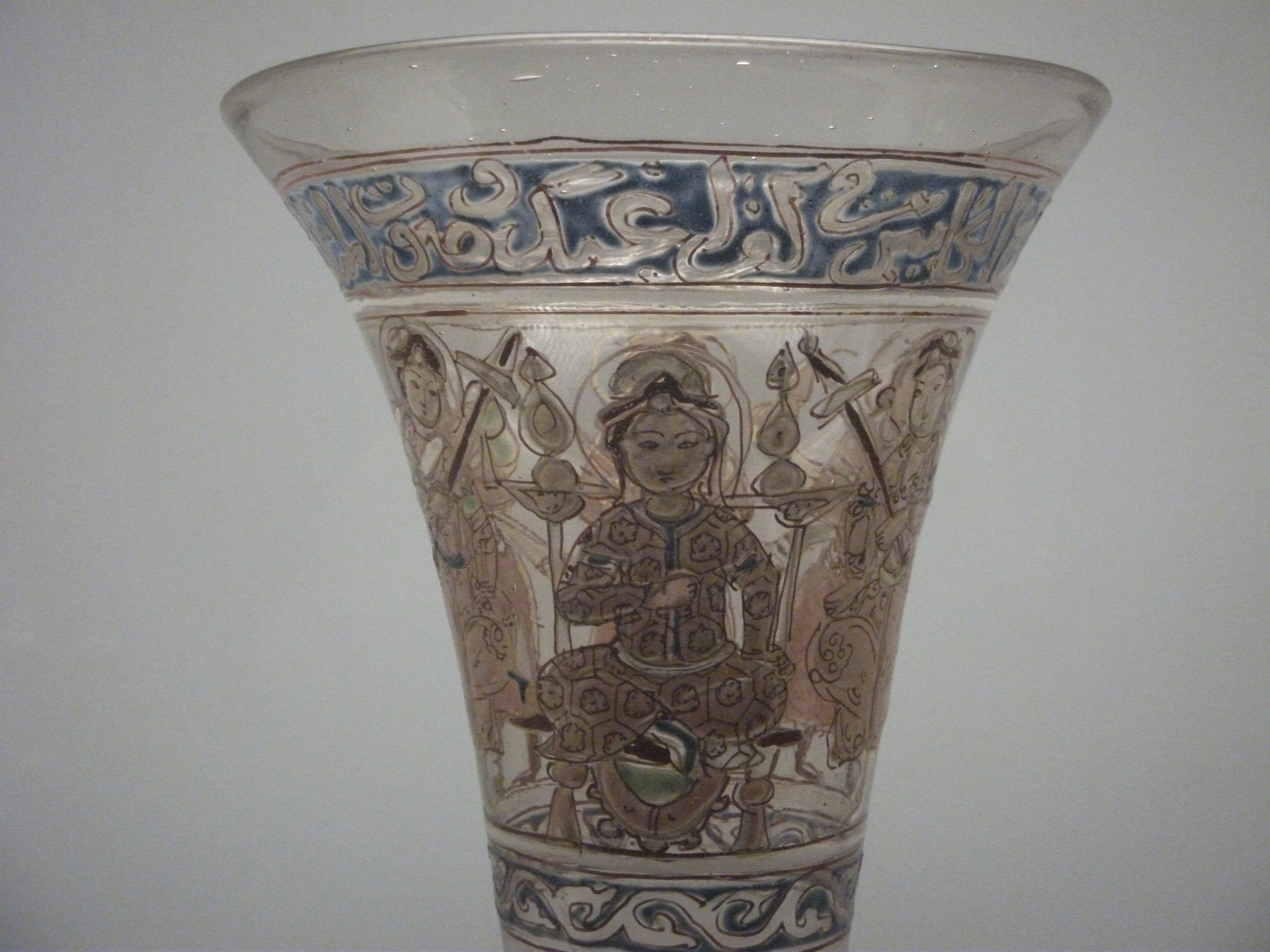
Seated prince on the Palmer Cup

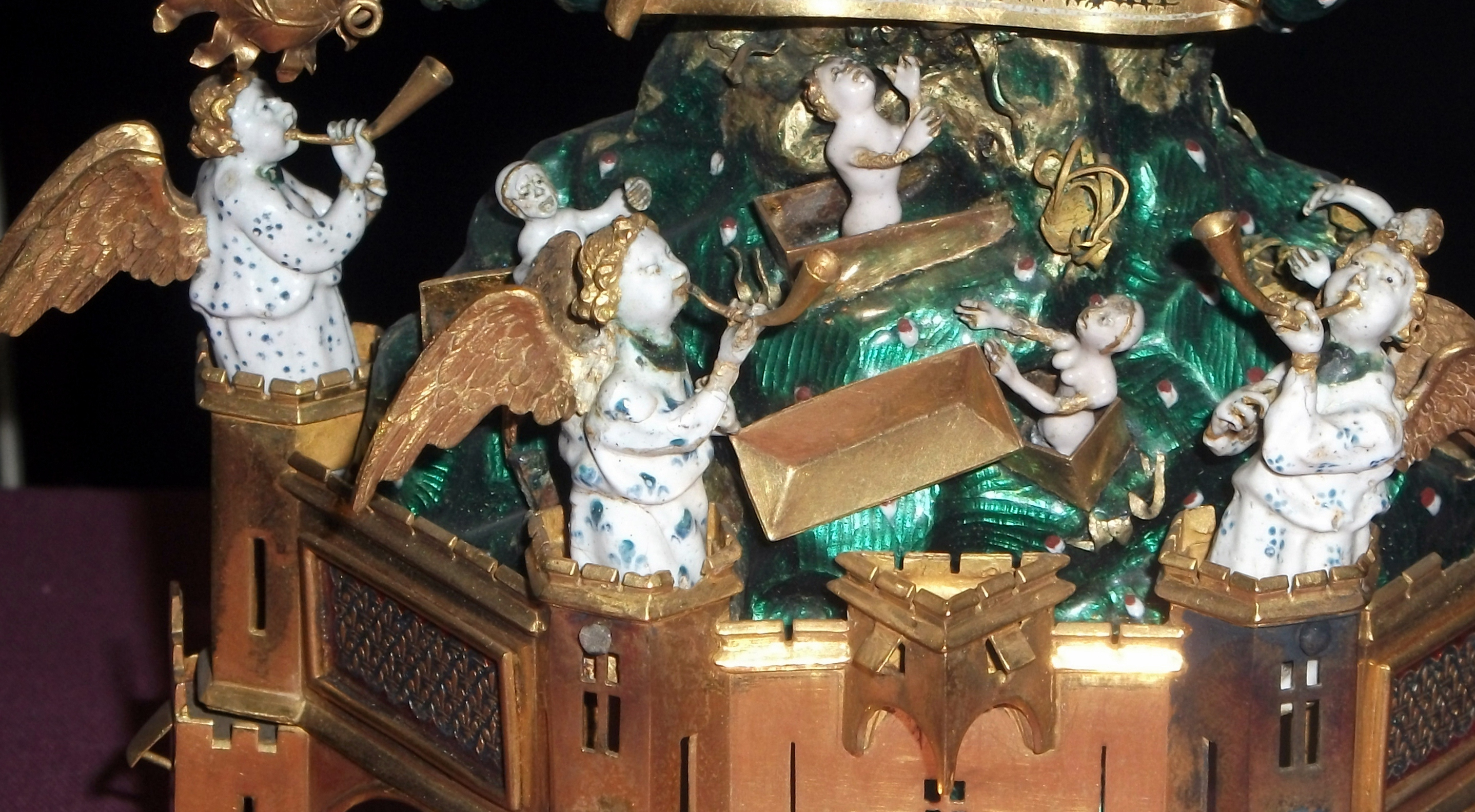
Resurrection of the Dead at the base of the Holy Thorn Reliquary

== Rock crystal and hardstone pieces ==
There are seven glass vessels in the collection, but a larger number of pieces in transparent rock crystal or quartz, a mineral that might easily be taken for glass. This was always a much more valuable and prestigious material, qualifying as a semi-precious stone. Needing very patient grinding and drilling, it is much harder to work than glass (though correspondingly less easy to break once finished), and the pieces include mounts or bases in precious metal, which none of the actual glass has; nor are the rock crystal pieces painted. Read's catalogue groups these and other pieces in semi-precious stone with the objects in gold, as opposed to the "silver plate", which probably reflects how a Renaissance collector would have ranked them. There are ten pieces in crystal and nine in other stones.

Two crystal pieces are plain oval plaques engraved with figurative scenes, a different tradition going back to pieces such as the Carolingian Lothair Crystal, also in the British Museum. In 1902 Read's catalogue suggested that "It is to this section that in all probability most eyes will be attracted, as well for the beauty of the specimens as for their rarity and consequent cost"; if this was the case then, it is probably not so a century later. Some pieces are now regarded as 19th-century, or largely so, and Reinhold Vasters, the Van Meegeren of Renaissance metalwork, is now held responsible in several cases.

A wide low crystal vase with cover is engraved with the name of the Mughal Emperor Akbar, and was long thought to have been German, but sent out to India as a diplomatic gift, as the metalwork mounts are clearly European in style. It is now seen as an original, and exceptionally rare, Mughal crystal carving, to which the mounts were added in the 19th century, perhaps in Paris. However the cartouche with Akbar's name does not seem to specialists correct for a contemporary court piece, and the vase in India was probably carved after his reign (1556–1605), and the name perhaps added even later.

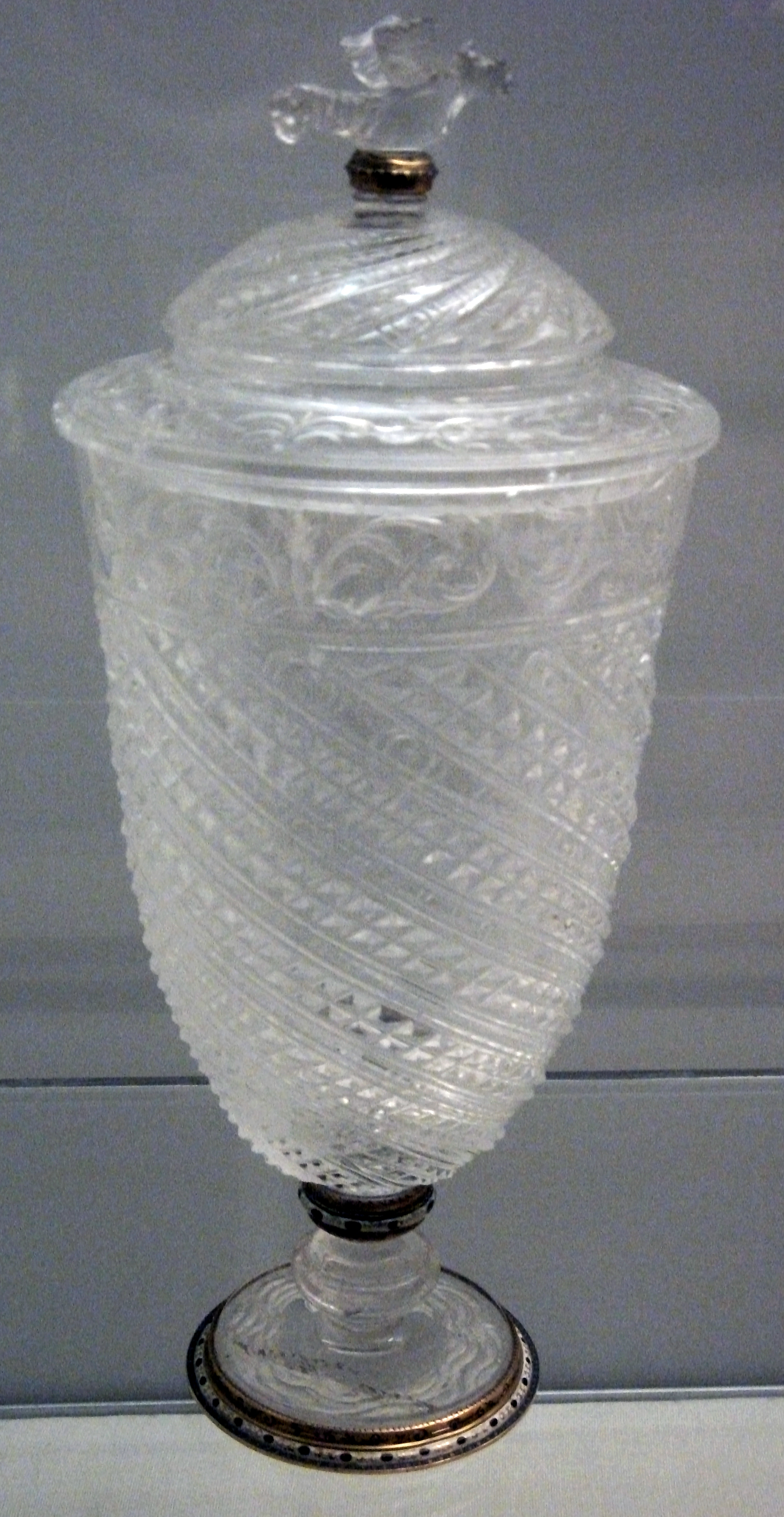
Rock crystal covered cup, around 1600, WB.76

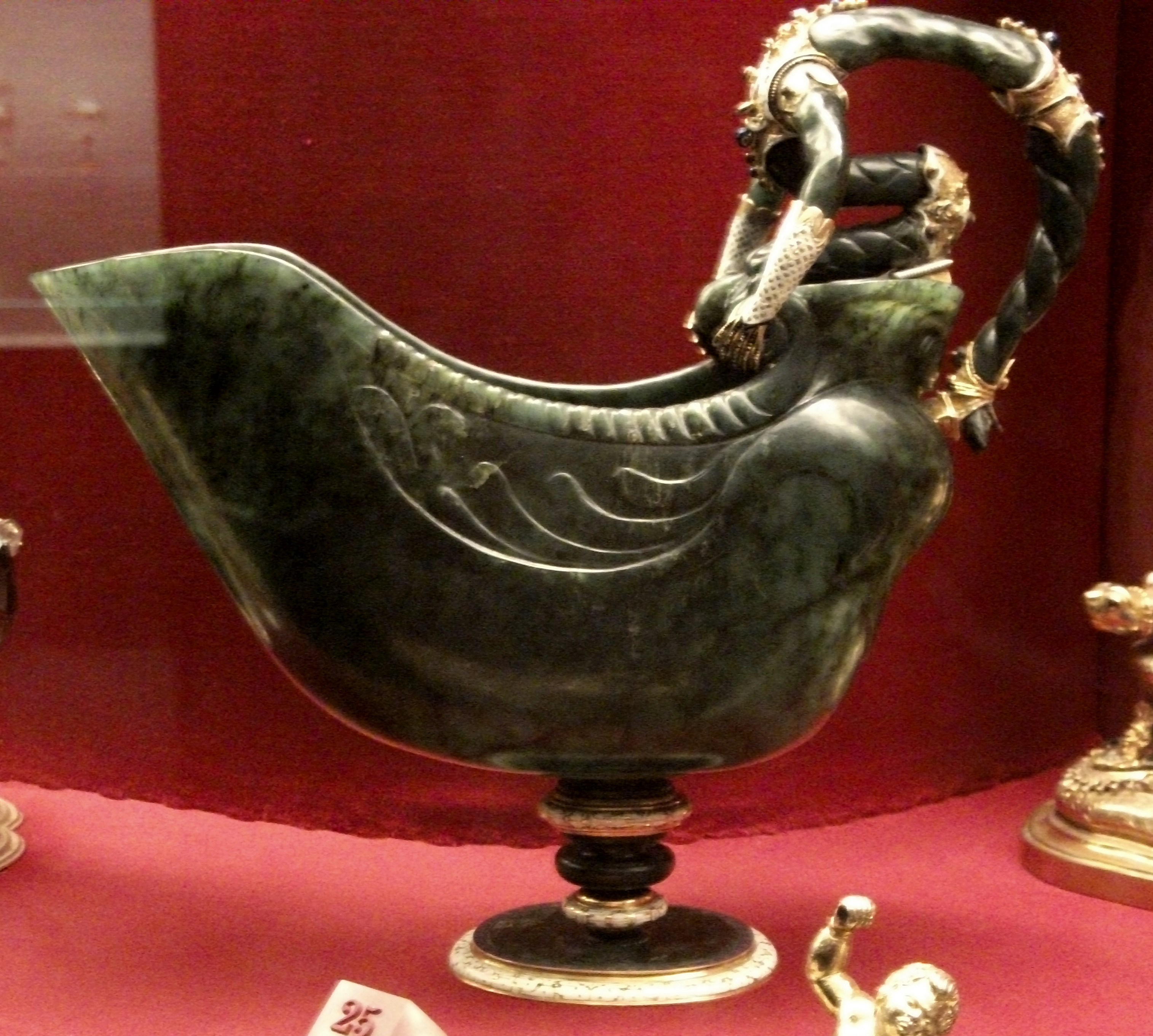
Jade, early 17th-century, the handle later, WB.81, Milan or Prague

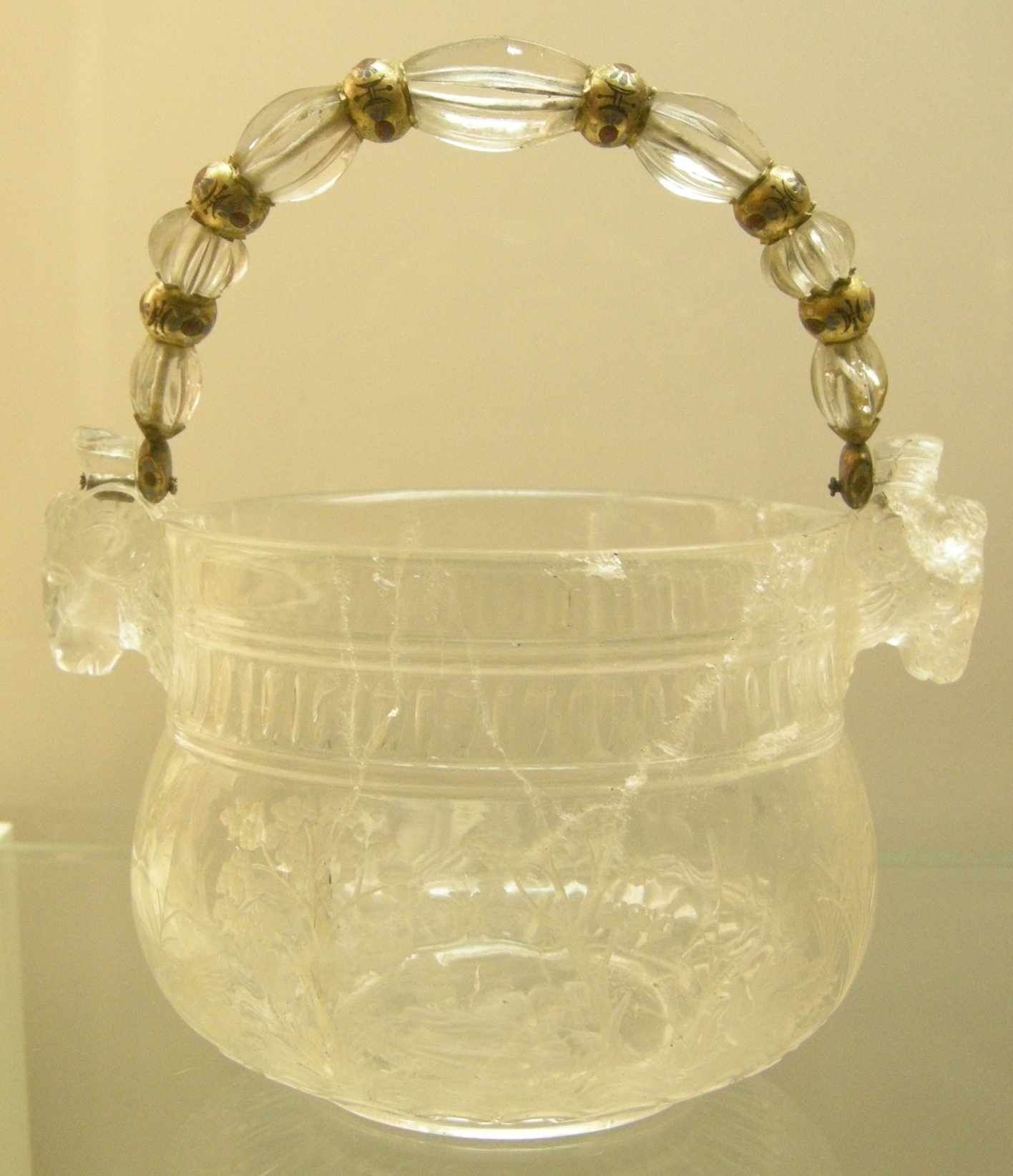
Rock crystal bucket, early 17th-century, the handle perhaps later, WB.80

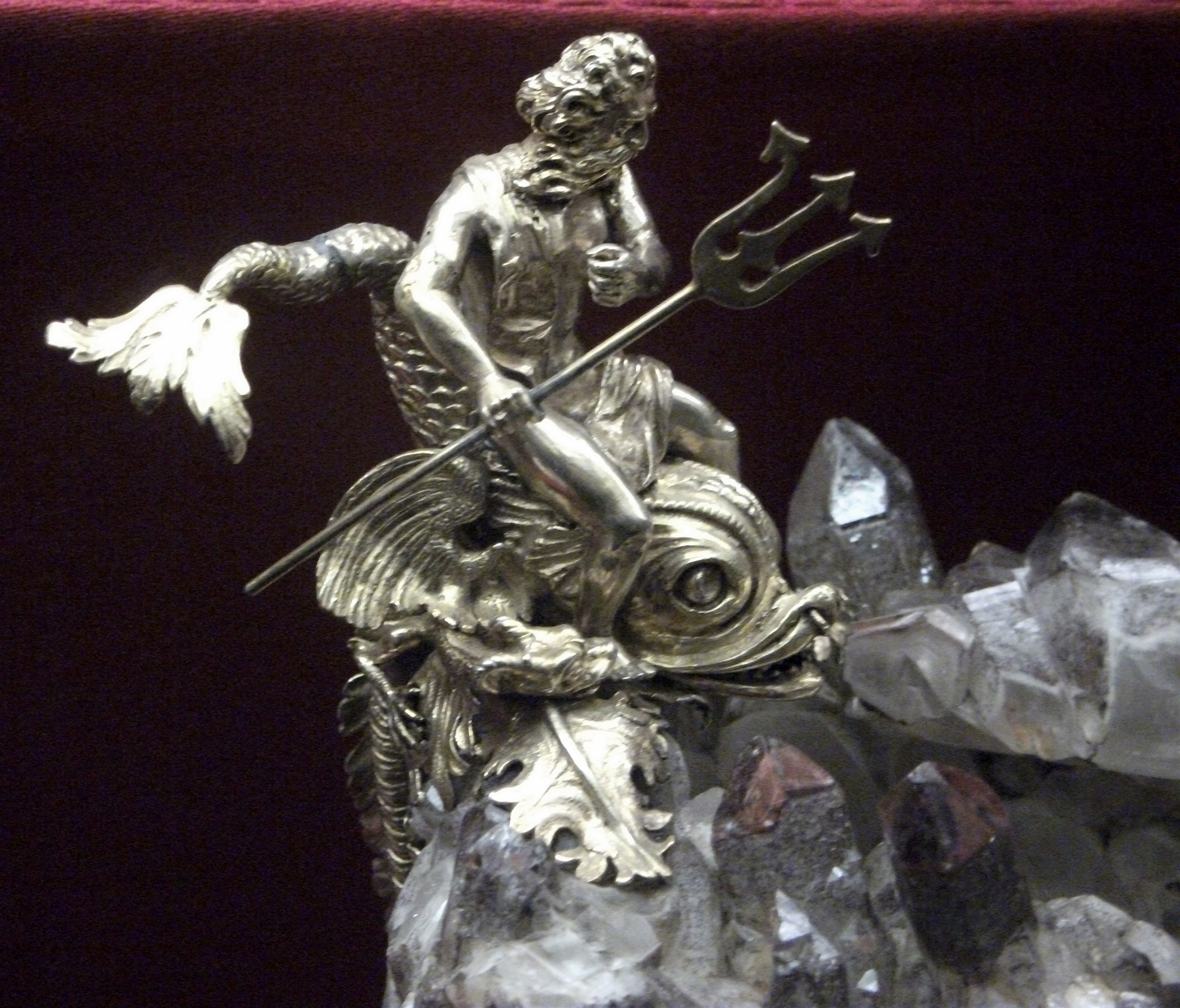
Detail of a silver Neptune in the mount of a crystal piece, probably by Reinhold Vasters about 1865–70, despite spurious 16th-century marks on the metal.

== Renaissance glass ==
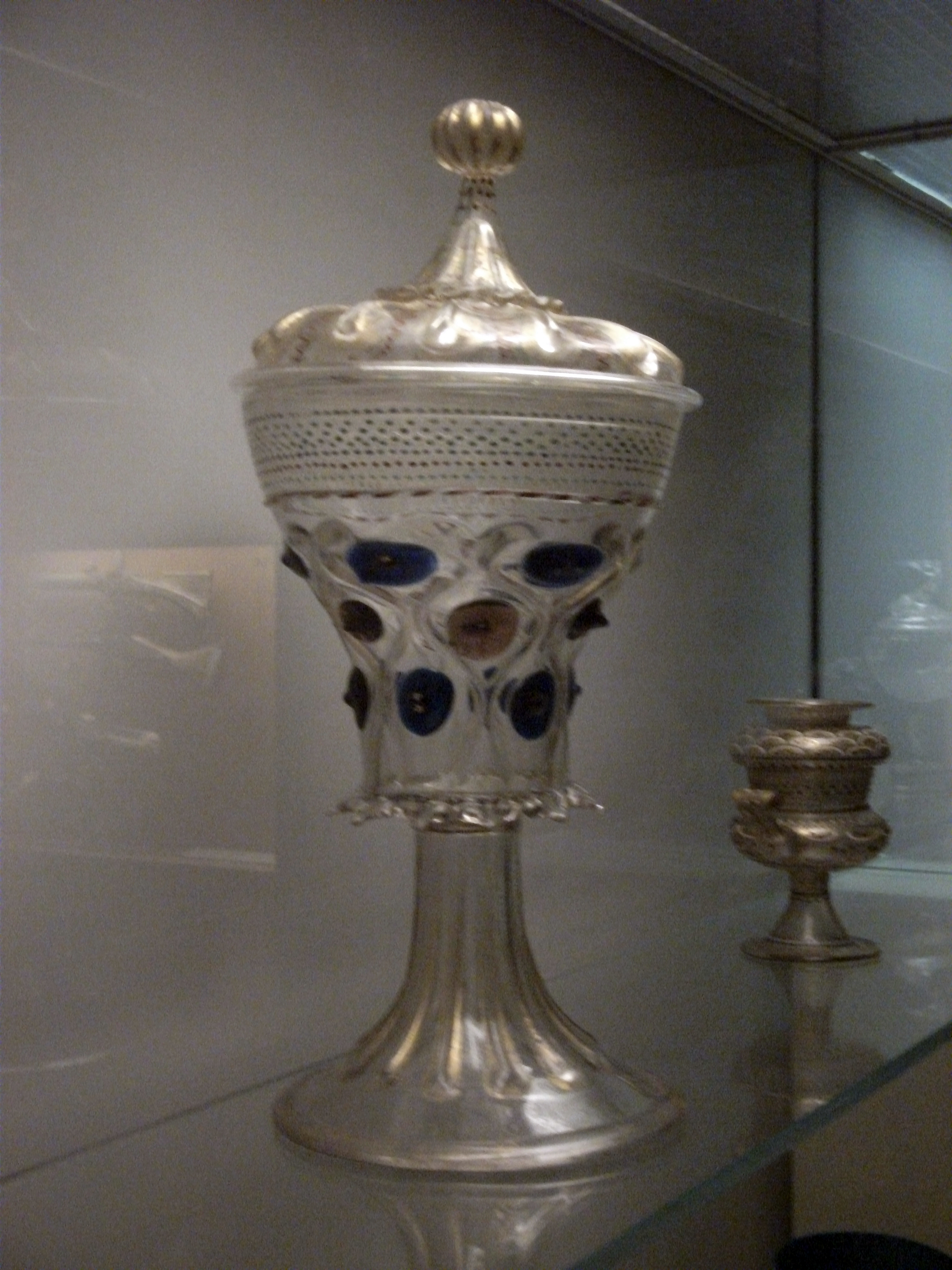
The Deblín Cup

Apart from the two pieces of Islamic glass described above, there are five Renaissance or Baroque glass vessels, all unusual and of exceptional quality. Most are Venetian glass; one is moulded opaque Bohemian glass (WB.56) with a Triumph of Neptune, and is now dated to the late 17th century; it is also dichroic glass, which changes colour depending on whether it is lit from the front or behind. There is a very rare goblet in opaque turquoise glass with enamels (WB.55); this was to imitate or suggest a vessel in even more expensive semi-precious stone. The late 15th-century Deblín Cup with its cover is one of a small group of vessels made in Murano, Venice in a German or Central European taste, drawing on metalwork shapes used there. It carries a later inscription in Czech urging that the health of the Lords of Deblín, near Brno, be drunk, and was probably the "welcome cup" of the castle there.

== Italian maiolica ==
The six pieces of painted Italian maiolica, or painted and tin-glazed earthenware, are all larger than the average, and there are none of the dishes that are the most common maiolica shape. The earliest piece is a large statue of Fortuna standing on a dolphin, holding a sail, by Giovanni della Robbia, made in Florence about 1500–10. This is a rare representative of the Early to High Italian Renaissance in the bequest.

The other pieces are from later in the 16th century. The most important are a pair of large snake-handled vases, nearly two feet (60 cm) high, painted with mythological scenes, to which French ormolu bases and lids were added shortly before they were bought in Paris by Horace Walpole for the "Gallery" at Strawberry Hill House in 1765–66. Ormolu mounts were often added by 18th-century collectors to such pieces, but few have remained in place.

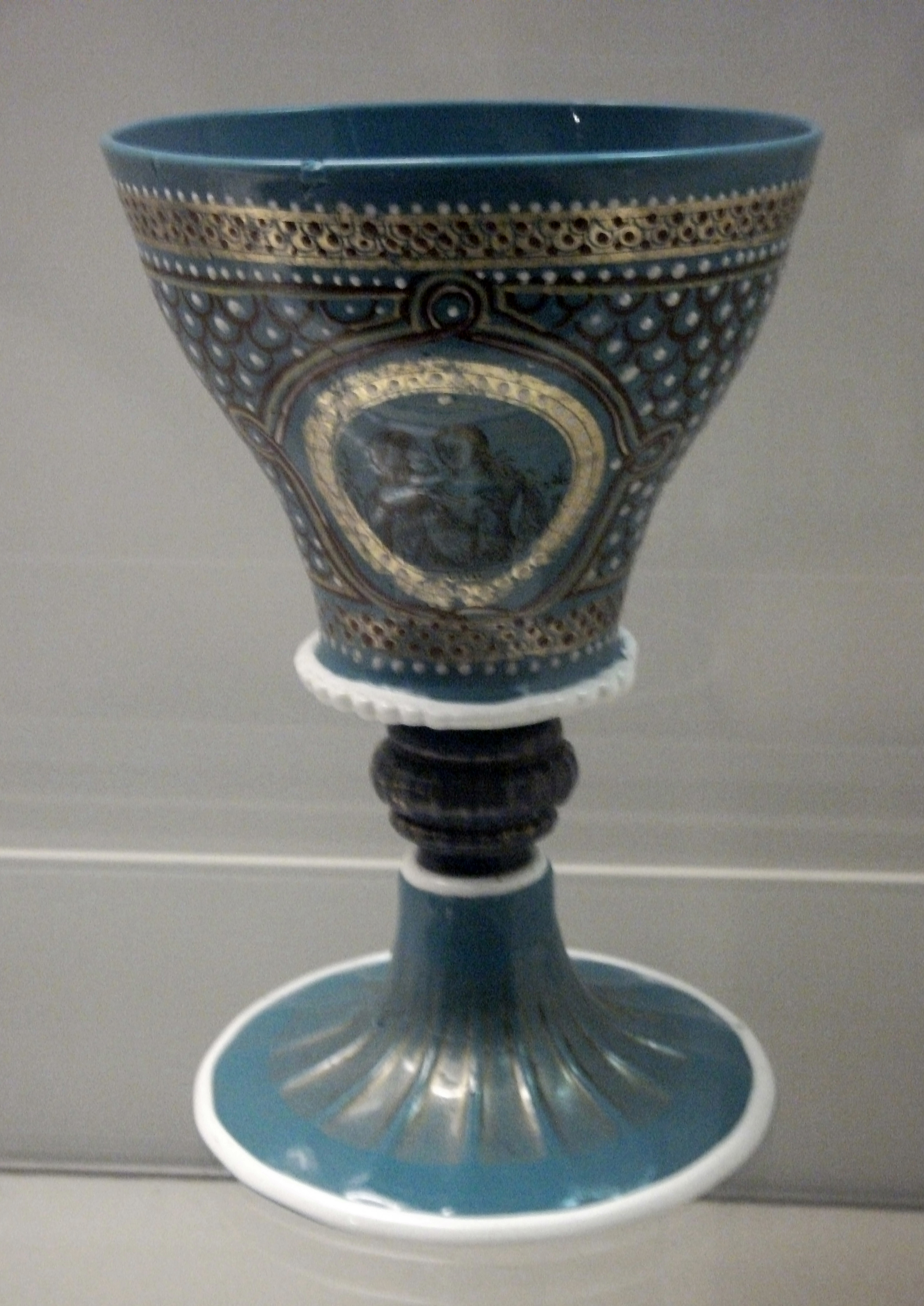
Goblet in opaque turquoise glass with enamel painted over (WB.55)

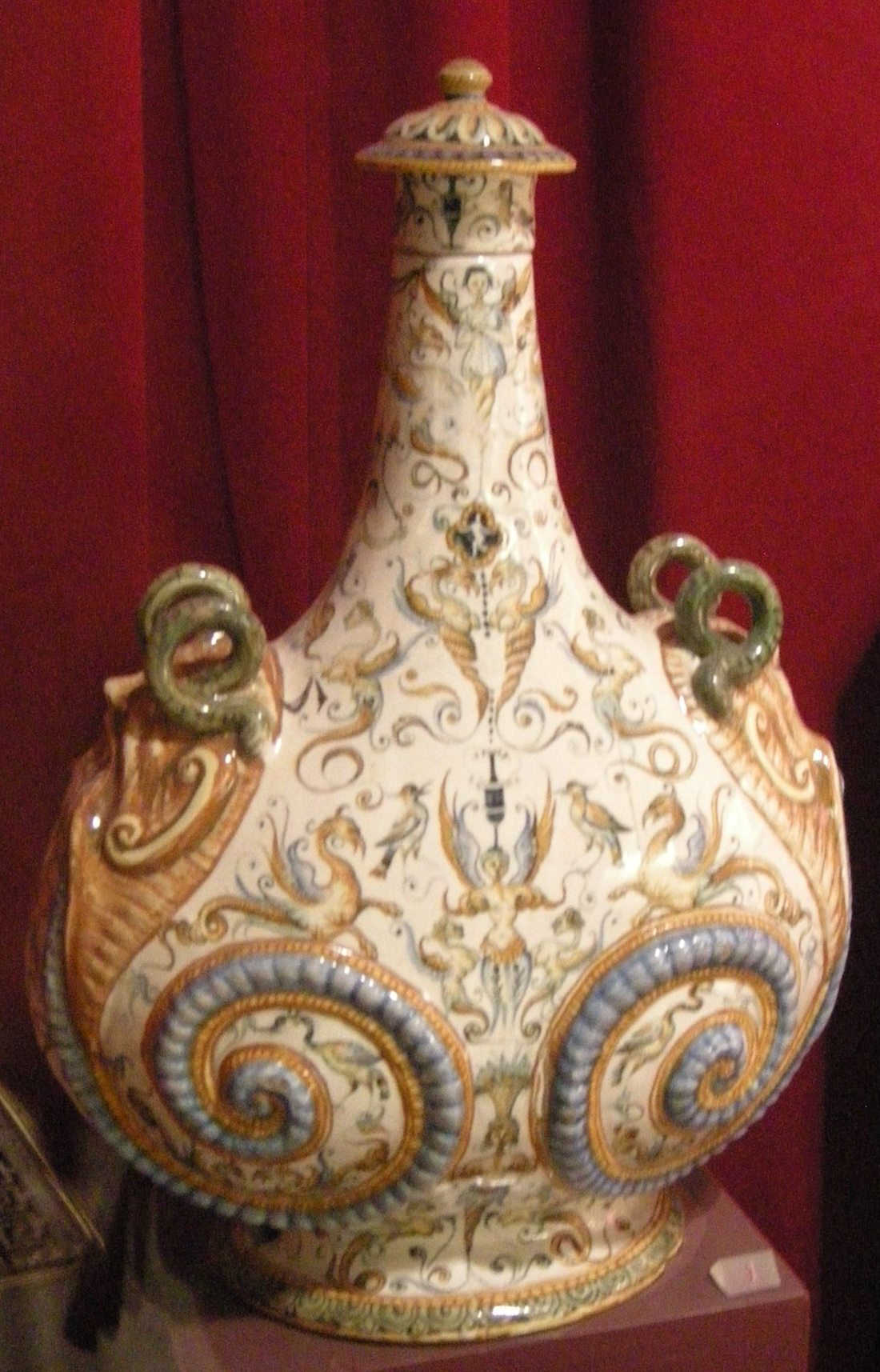
Maiolica pilgrim bottle, 1560–70

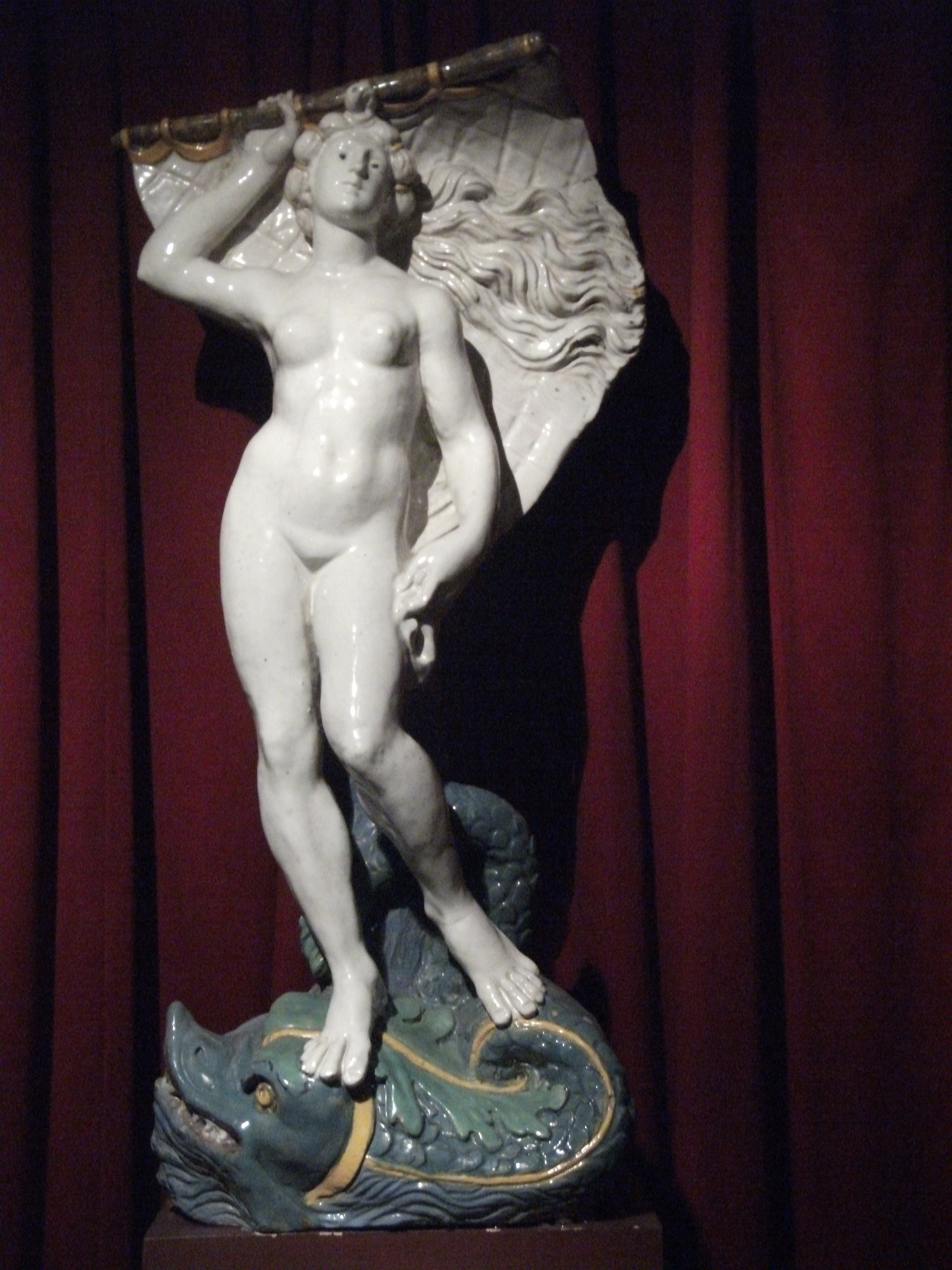
Fortuna standing on a dolphin, in maiolica, Florence, 1500–10

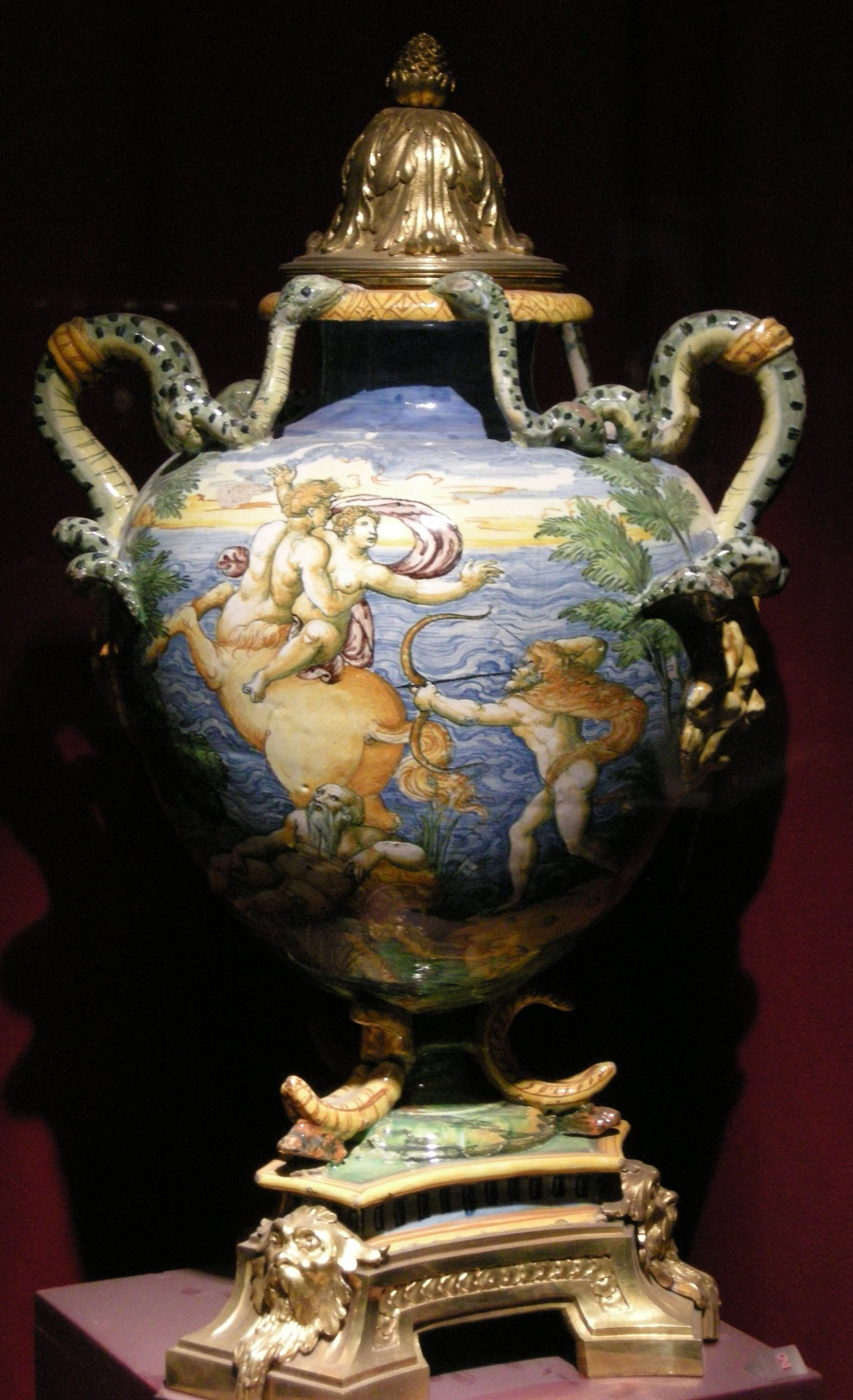
One of Horace Walpole's maiolica vases, 1565–71, with Parisian ormolu mounts

== Other types of object ==
The collection includes a number of other objects, including a few guns, swords and military or hunting equipment. There is also a German brass "hunting calendar" with several thin leaves that unfold. These include recessed lines filled with wax, enabling the keen hunter on a large scale to record his bags of wolf, bear, deer, boar and rabbit, as well as the performance of his dogs. There is a small cabinet with 11 drawers (plus other secret ones) made as a classical facade, or perhaps a theatre stage with scenery; the decoration is mostly damascened iron, and is 16th-century Milanese work.

Apart from the older woodcarvings discussed above, the bequest includes a number of small mostly German Renaissance portraits as carvings in wood, either in relief or in the round. These are of very high quality and include two miniature busts by Conrad Meit of Philibert II, Duke of Savoy, who died young before the bust was made, and his Habsburg wife, Margaret of Austria. There are also some medallion portraits in very soft stone, that allows fine detail, and one allegorical scene attributed to Peter Flötner.

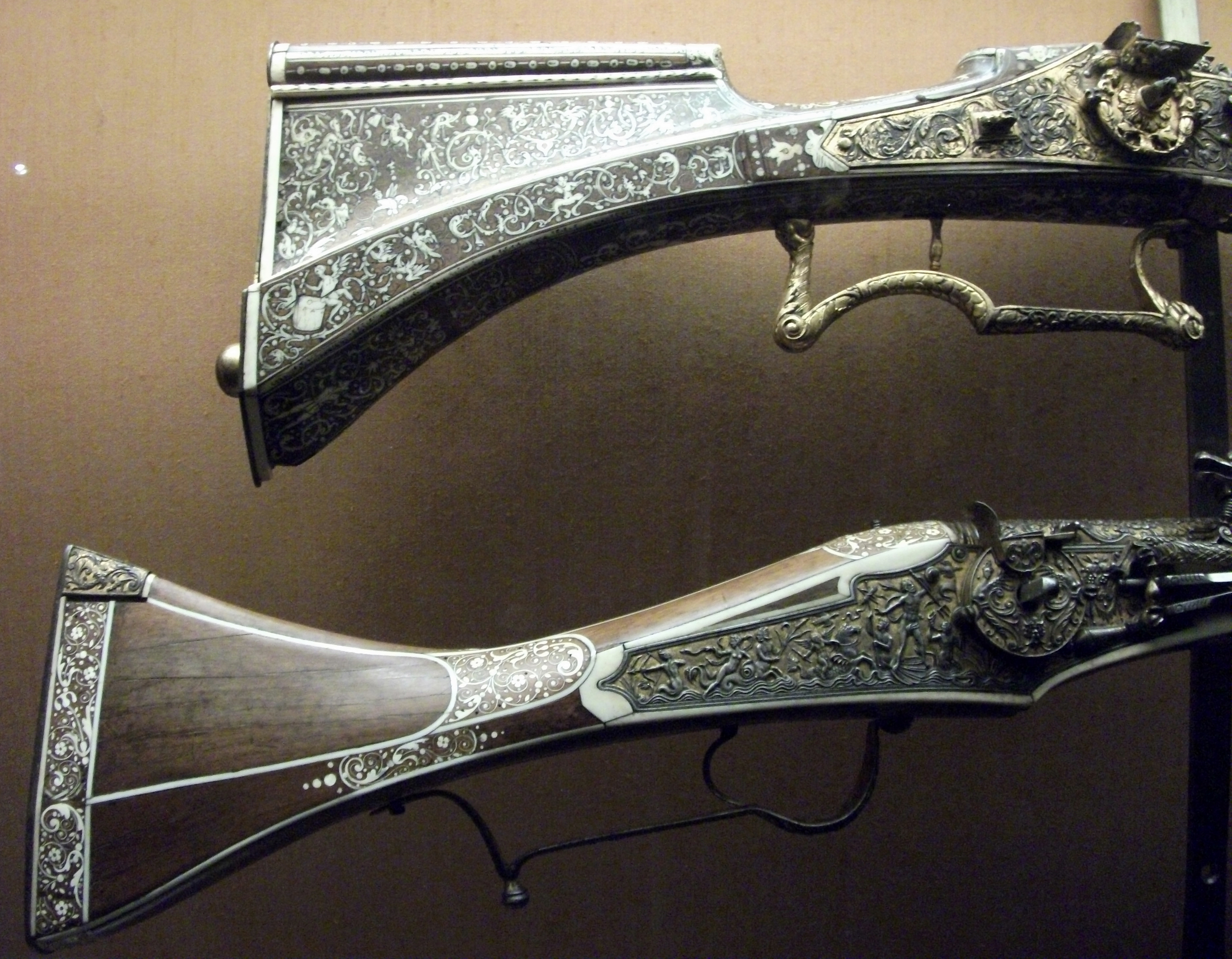
Inlaid stocks of two German guns

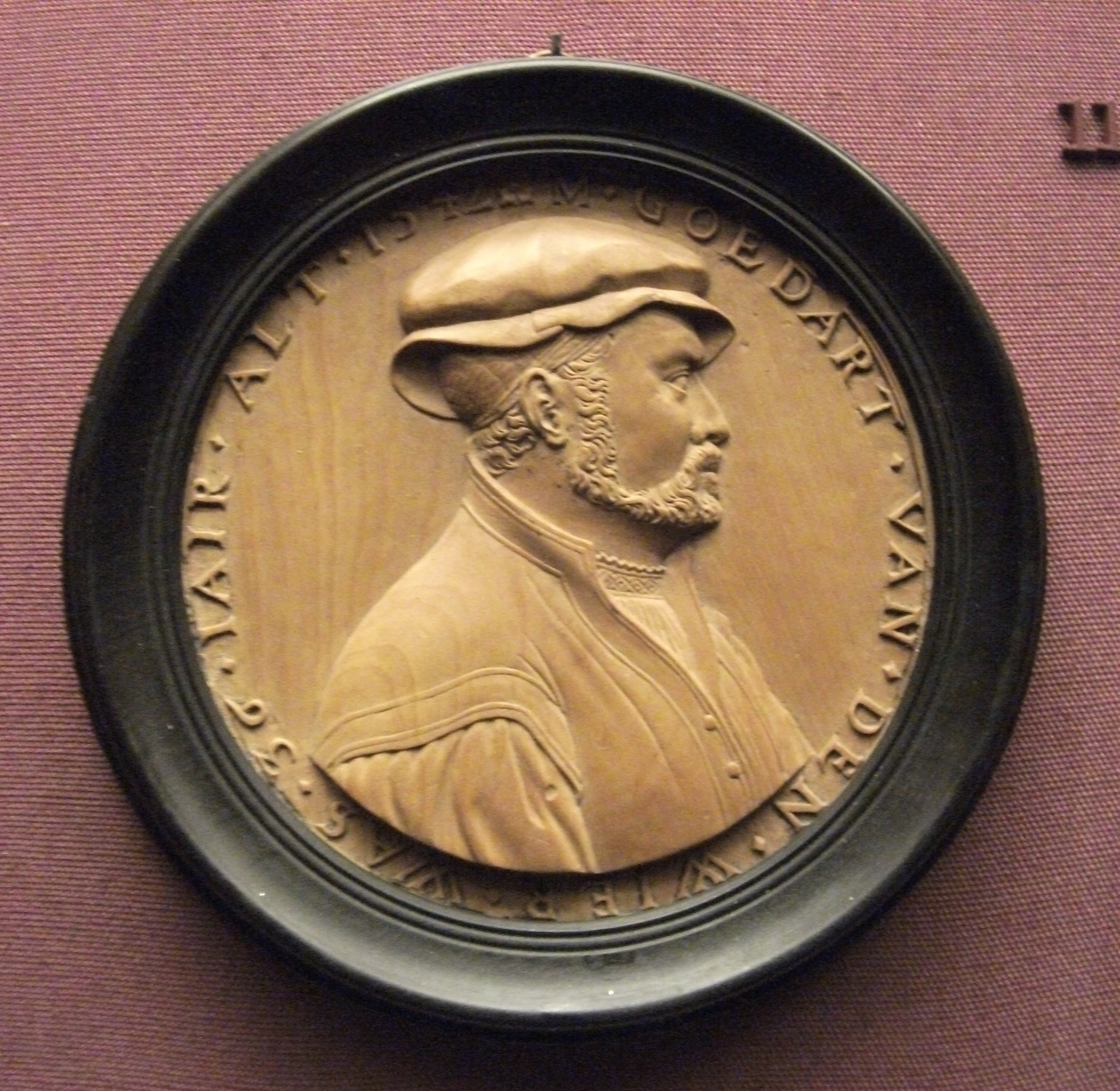
Boxwood miniature, German, 1544

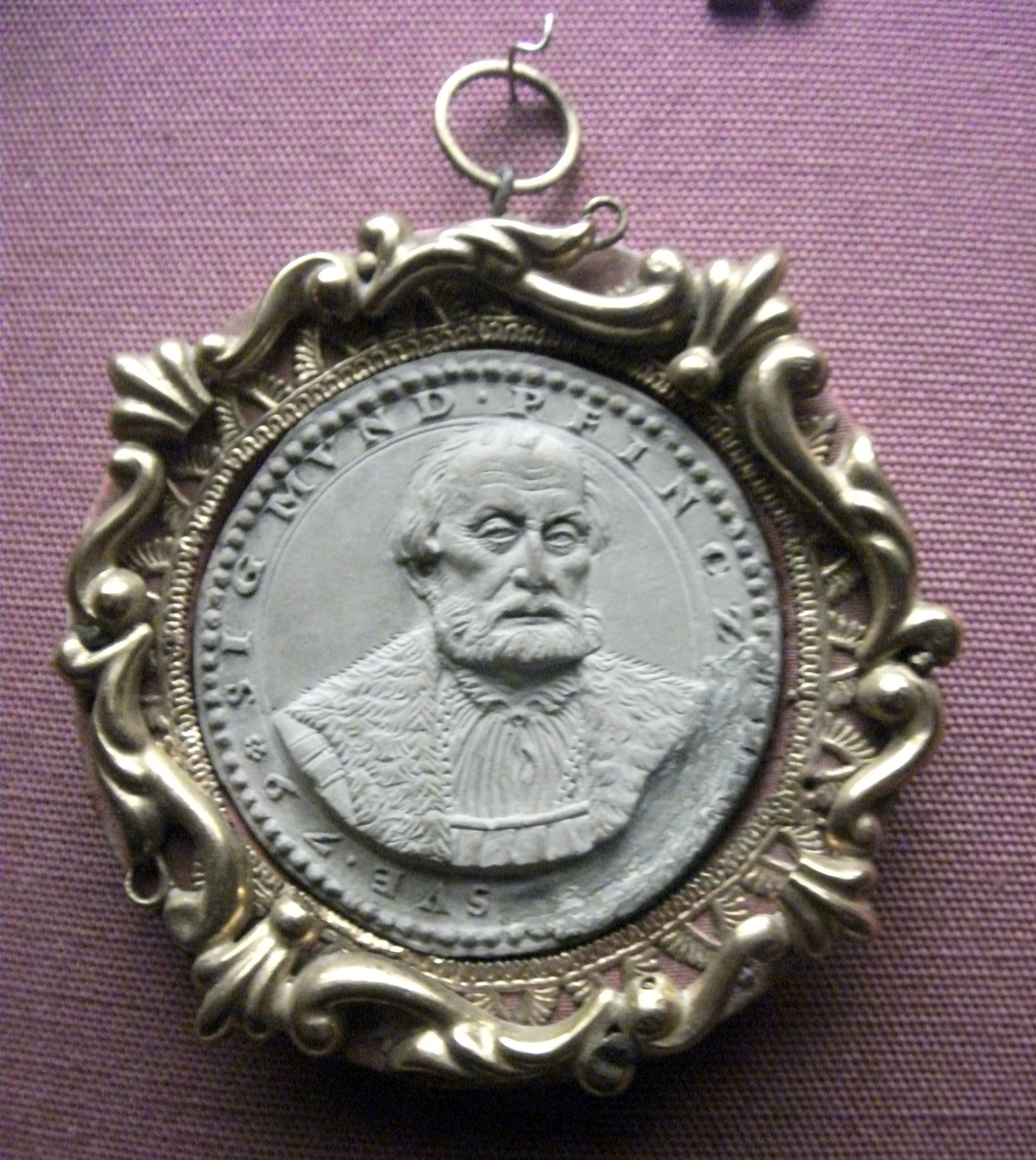
Portrait miniature in stone, 1544, Sigmund Pfinzing, aged 79, WB.255

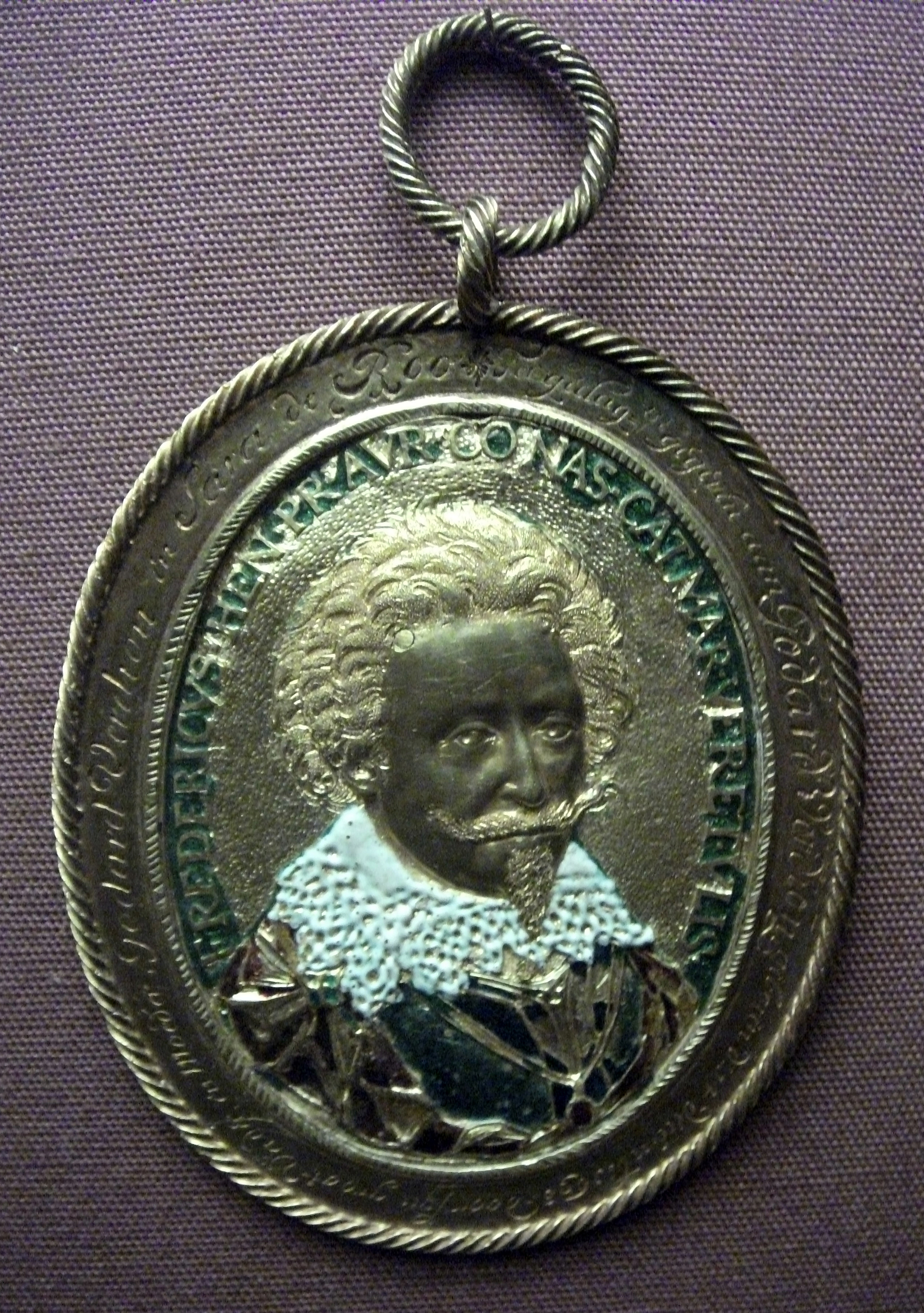
Enamelled gold miniature of Frederick Henry, Prince of Orange, 1627, WB.173

== Fakes and revised attributions ==
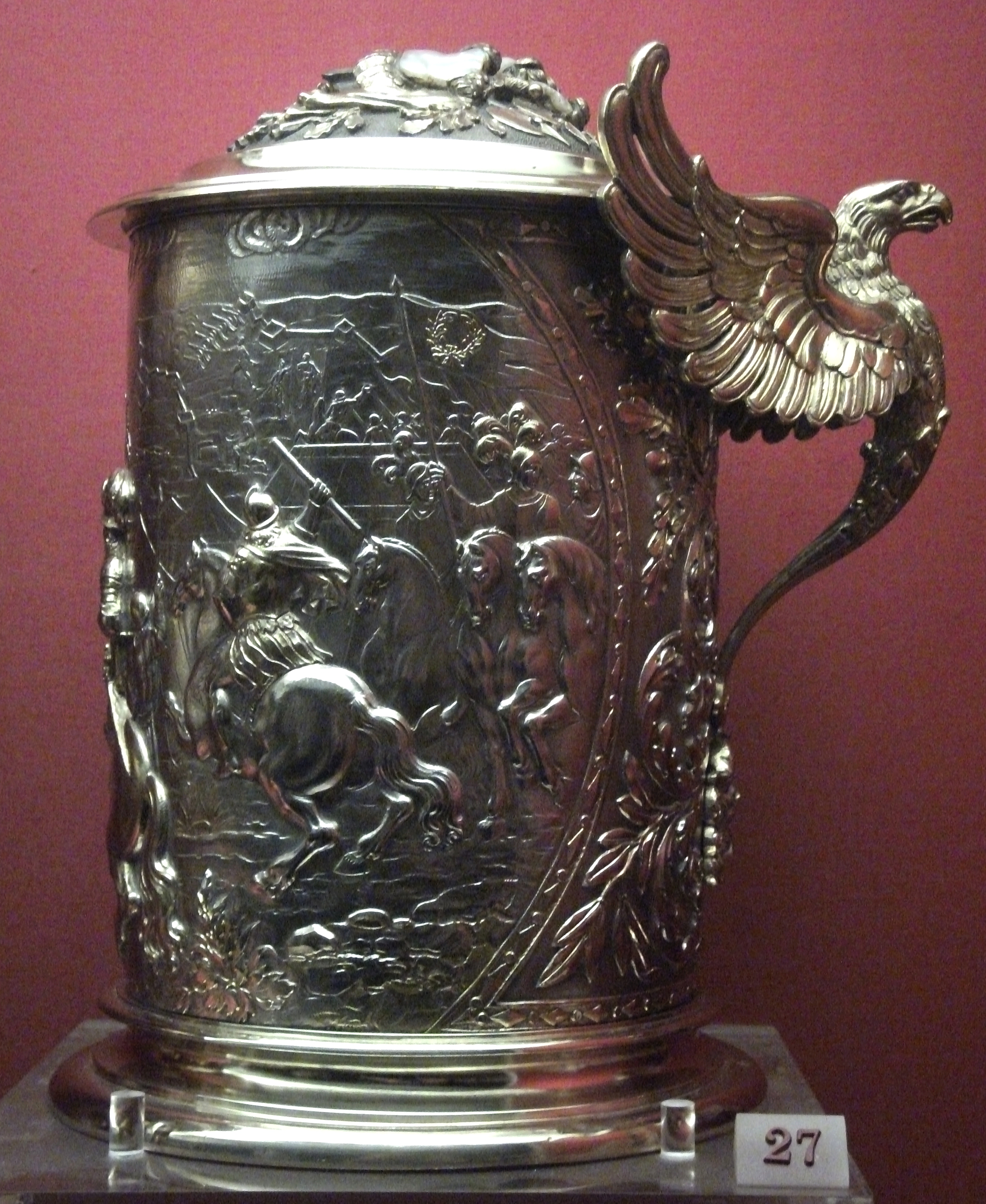
Silver tankard, once called Dutch and late 17th-century, now "Berlin, 1826–1875 (?)"; WB.130

Any collection formed before the 20th century (and many later ones) is likely to contain pieces that can no longer sustain their original attributions. In general the Waddesdon Bequest can be said to have held up well in this regard, and the most significant brush with forgery has been to benefit the collection. In 1959 it was confirmed that the Waddesdon Holy Thorn Reliquary had been in the Habsburg Imperial Treasury in Vienna from 1677 onwards. It remained in Vienna until after 1860, when it appeared in an exhibition. Some time after this it was sent to be restored by Salomon Weininger, an art dealer with access to skilled craftsmen, who secretly made a number of copies. He was later convicted of other forgeries, and died in prison in 1879, but it was still not realised that he had returned one of his copies of the reliquary to the Imperial collections instead of the original, and later sold the original, which is now in the bequest. One of the copies remained in the Ecclesiastical Treasury of the Imperial Habsburg Court in Vienna, where the deception remained undetected for several decades.

In the 19th century a number of types of object were especially subject to major reworking, combining some original parts with those newly made. This was especially a feature of arms and armour, jewellery, and objects combining hardstone carvings and metal mounts. This was mostly done by dealers, but sometimes collectors also.

Another object with a complicated and somewhat uncertain history is a two-handled agate vase with Renaissance-style metal mounts, which was acquired, with other similar pieces, for Waddesdon from the Duke of Devonshire's collection about 1897, not long before Baron Ferdinand's death. Sir Hugh Tait's 1991 catalogue says of the vase:

"Origin:
(i) Carved agate: authenticity is uncertain; since 1899 loosely described as "antique Roman" or "antique", but recently attributed to the late Roman period, c. AD 400.
(ii) Enamelled gold mounts and cover: previously described as "Italian, 16th-century" and, subsequently, attributed to Benvenuto Cellini (1500–71) but now attributed to the hand of an early 19th-century copyist – before 1834 – perhaps working in London."

As he describes, it was Tait who overturned the attribution to Cellini in 1971.

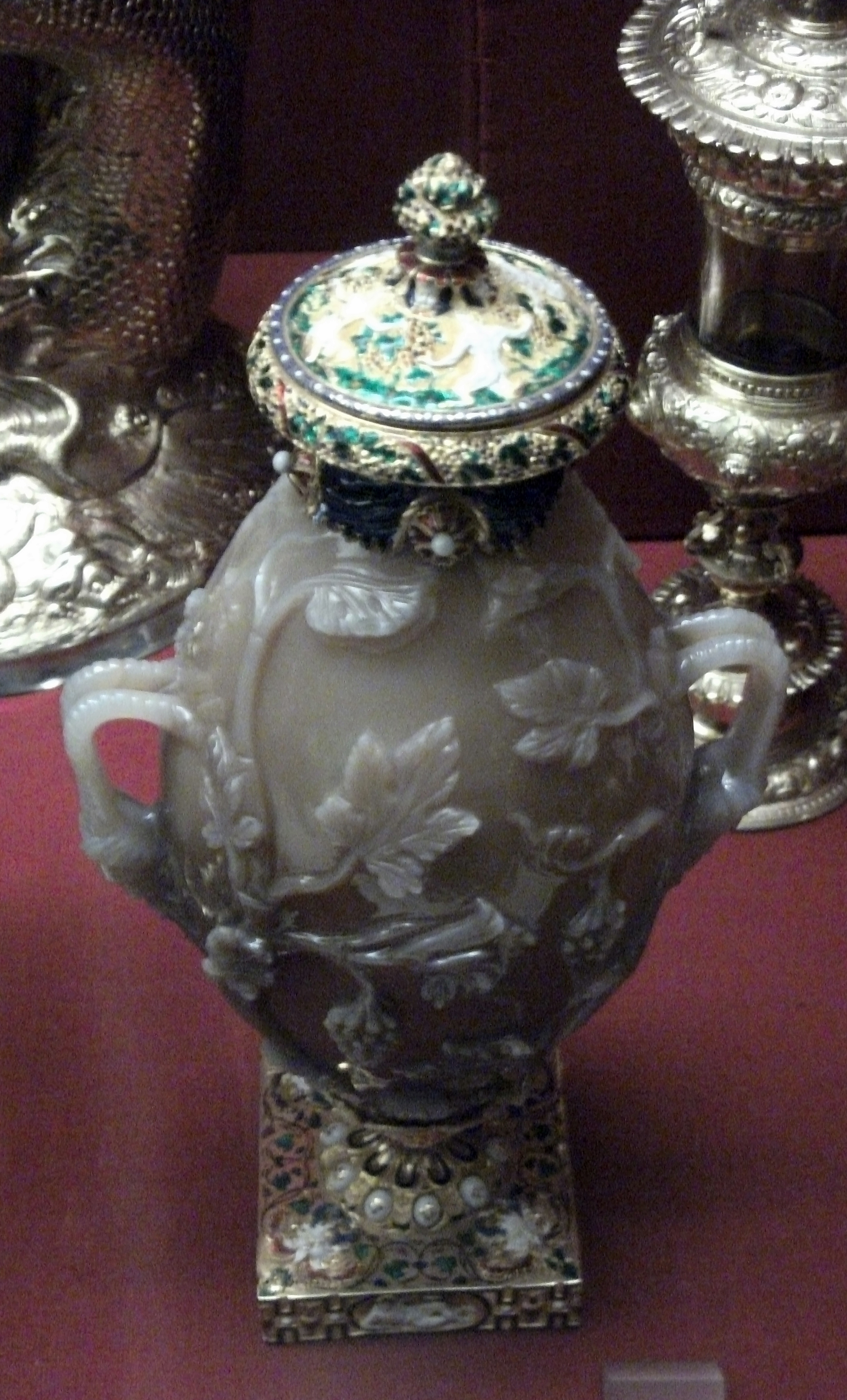
The agate vase, probably Roman, with later mounts

In a collection of Renaissance metalwork Benvenuto Cellini (1500–71) represents the ultimate attribution, as his genuine works as a goldsmith are rarer than paintings by Giorgione. In his 1902 catalogue Charles Hercules Read mentions that many of the pendants had been attributed to Cellini, but refrains from endorsing the attributions. A small silver hand-bell (WB.95) had belonged to Horace Walpole, who praised it extravagantly in a letter as "the uniquest thing in the world, a silver bell for an inkstand made by Benvenuto Cellini. It makes one believe all the extravagant encomiums he bestows on himself; indeed so does his Perseus. Well, my bell is in the finest taste, and is swarmed by caterpillars, lizards, grasshoppers, flies, and masques, that you would take it for one of the plagues of Egypt. They are all in altissimo, nay in out-issimo relievo and yet almost invisible but with a glass. Such foliage, such fruitage!" However Baron Ferdinand had realized that it was more likely to be by Wenzel Jamnitzer, goldsmith to the Emperor Rudolf II, to whom it is still attributed. Another piece no longer attributed to Cellini is a large bronze door-knocker, with a figure of Neptune, 40 cm high, and weighing over 11 kilos.

One category of the bequest that has seen several demotions is the 16 pieces and sets of highly decorated cutlery (WB.201–216). Read dated none of these later than the 17th century, but on the British Museum database in 2014 several were dated to the 19th century, and were recent fraudulent creations when they entered the collection, some made by Reinhold Vasters. Doubts have also been raised over a glass cup and cover bearing the date 1518 (WB.59), which might in fact be 19th-century. Eight pieces of silver plate were redated to the 19th century by Hugh Tait, and some of the jewellery.

== Display ==
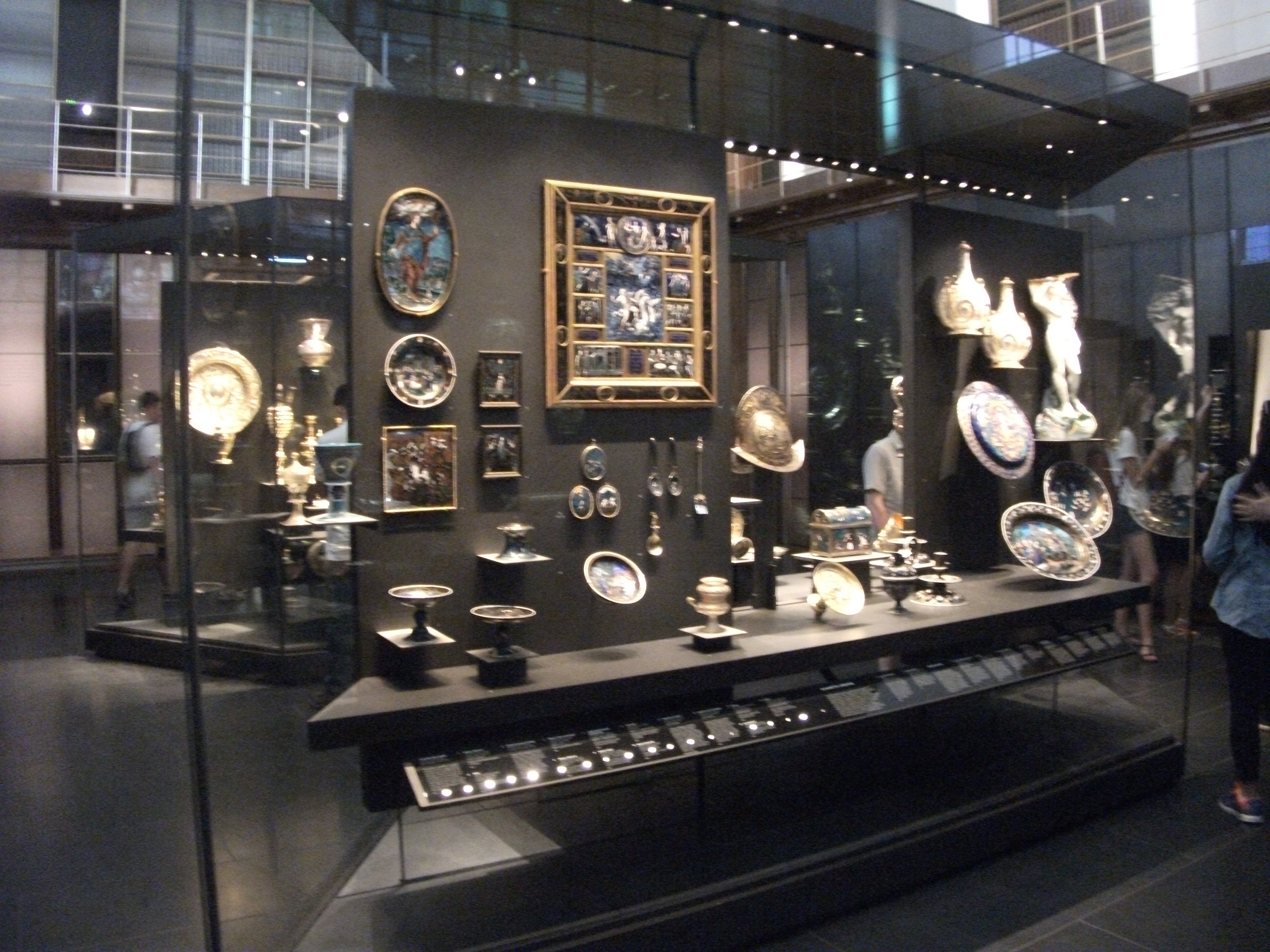
The Waddesdon Bequest has been redisplayed in Gallery 2a since June 2015.

The Bequest was on display at the British Museum from 9 April 1900, in Room 40, which today contains the later medieval displays. An illustrated catalogue by Charles Hercules Read, who had replaced Franks as Keeper of British and Medieval Antiquities, was published in 1902. Photographs in the catalogue show a typical museum display for the period, with wood and glass cases spaced around the walls and free-standing in the centre, the latter with two levels. In 1921 it was moved to the North Wing.

In 1973 the new setting in Room 45 aimed "to create an element of surprise and wonder" in a small space, where only the objects were brightly lit, and displayed in an outer octagon of wall cases, and an inner one of partition walls, rising to the low ceiling and set with shallow display cases, some visible from both sides. In the centre the Holy Thorn Reliquary occupied its own pillar display.

The new ground floor room at the front of the museum, opened in June 2015, returns the Bequest to a larger space and a more open setting. It is in the oldest part of the building and some later accretions to the room have been removed as part of the new installation. The design is by the architects Stanton Williams, and the project received funding from The Rothschild Foundation.
