= Jean Court =

French painter

Jean Court, called Vigier, was one of the most skillful of the Limoges enamel painters who flourished at Limoges in the 16th century. His works are very rare and bear the dates 1556 and 1557 only. Almost all are painted in grisaille on a black ground, and heightened with gold, the flesh being tinted. Some of his enamels are in the Louvre. He died about 1583, being then not less than 72 years of age. Much confusion has existed on account of the similarity of the names and monograms, and often of the works, between this artist, Jean de Court, and Jean Courteys.
