= Limoges enamel =

Metal objects decorated in enamel in Limoges

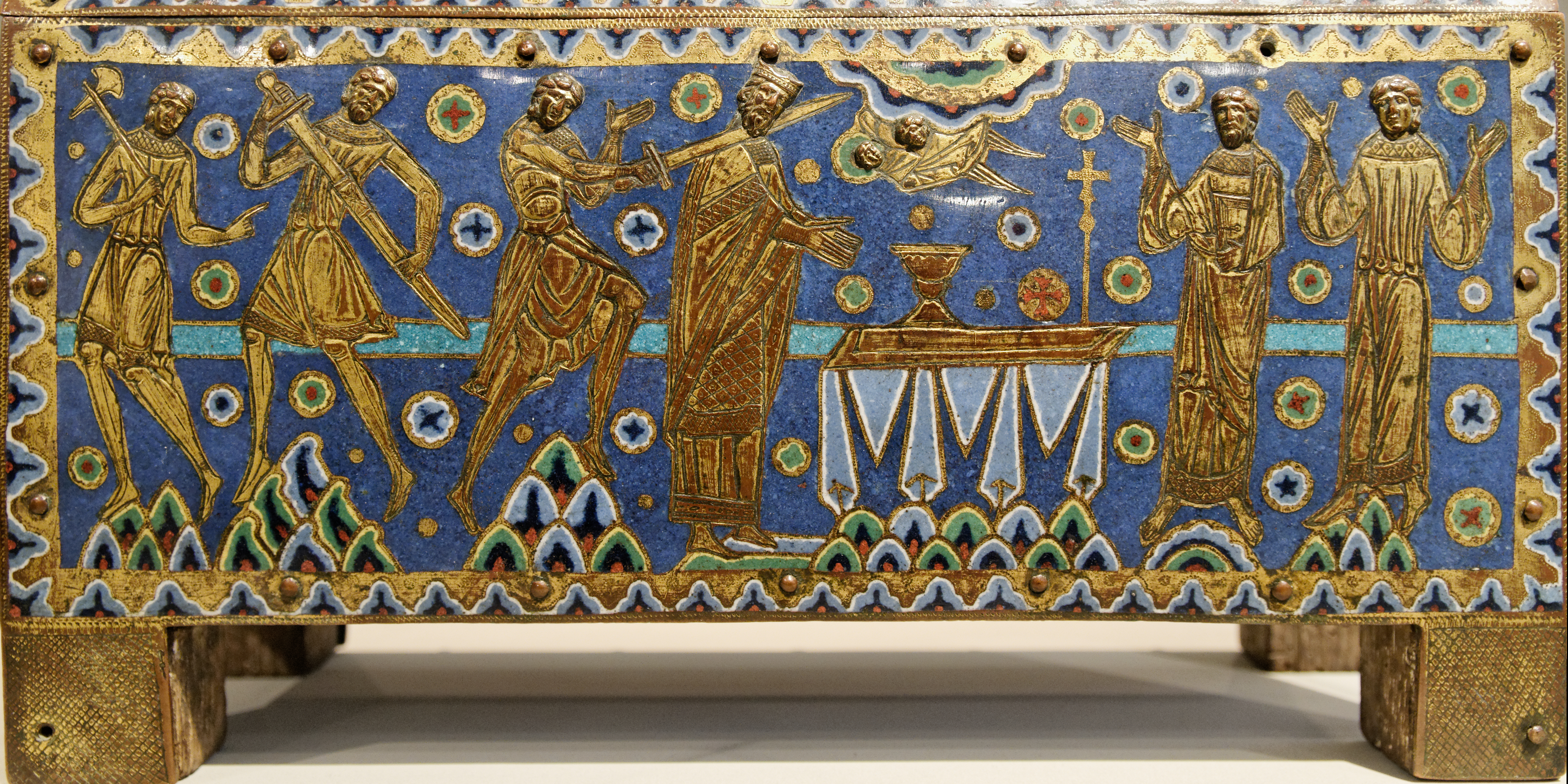
The martyrdom of Saint Thomas Becket, champlevé, 1180s (detail)

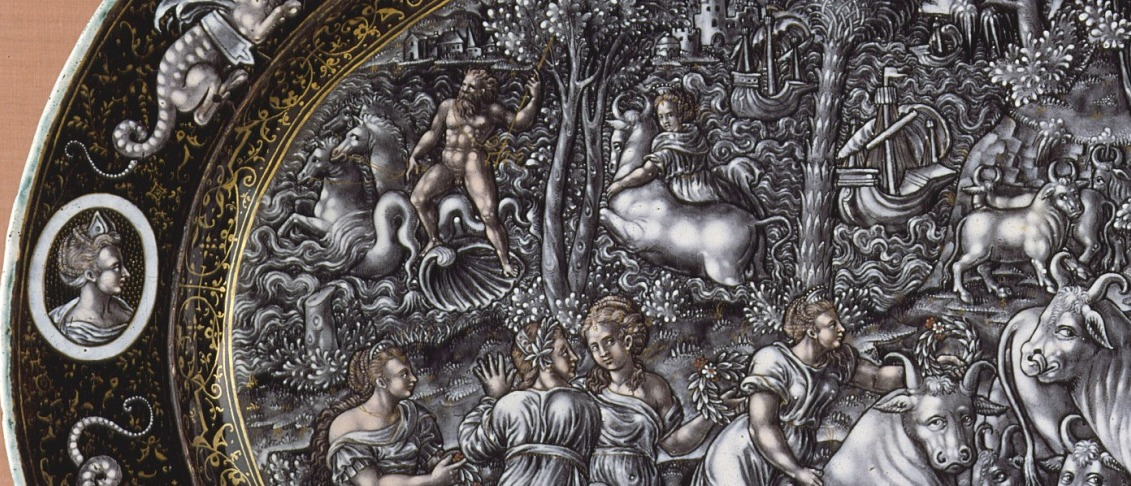
Detail of grisaille painted plate with the Rape of Europa, Jean de Court, c. 1560; the full piece

Limoges enamel has been produced at Limoges, in south-western France, over several centuries up to the present. There are two periods when it was of European importance. From the 12th century to 1370 there was a large industry producing metal objects decorated in enamel using the champlevé technique, of which most of the survivals (estimated at around 7,500 pieces), and probably most of the original production, are religious objects such as reliquaries.

After a gap of a century, the industry revived in the late 15th century, now specializing in the technique of painted enamel, and within a few decades making rather more secular than religious pieces. In the French Renaissance it was the leading centre, with several dynastic workshops, who often signed or punchmarked their work. Luxury pieces such as plates, plaques and ewers were painted with sophisticated Mannerist decoration of pictorial figure scenes, which on vessels were surrounded by elaborate borders.

In both periods the largest pieces include narrative scenes. These exemplify the styles of their respective periods. In the medieval champlevé the action is simply and directly shown by a few figures, with patterned backgrounds. In the Mannerist painted pieces numerous figures and detailed backgrounds tend to overwhelm the activity of the main figures.

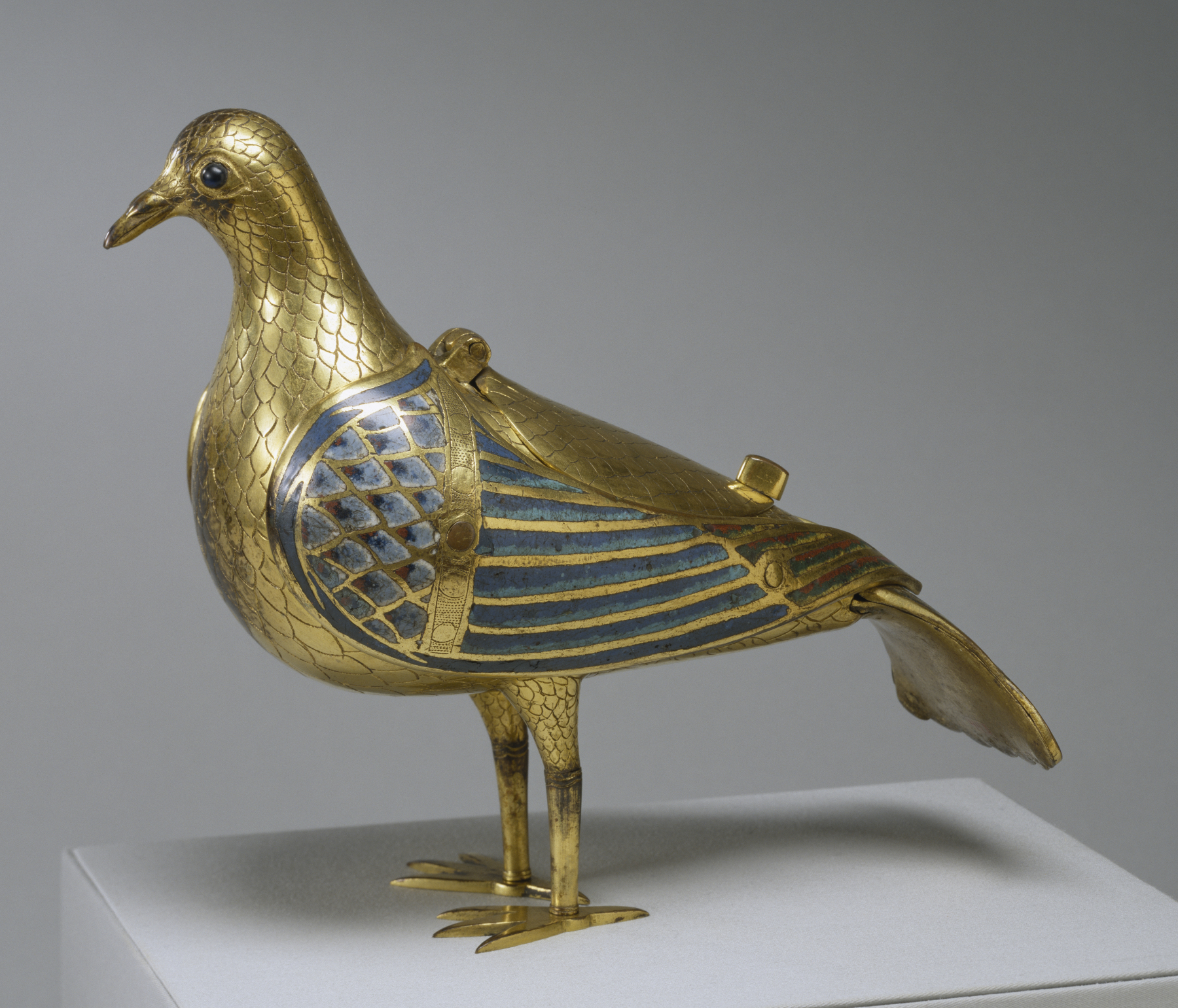
Eucharistic dove in champlevé, early 13th-century

After a decline from about 1630, and later competition from porcelain, high-quality production revived in the mid-19th century, and adopted Art Nouveau and other contemporary styles, with a relatively small production.

== Medieval champlevé enamel ==
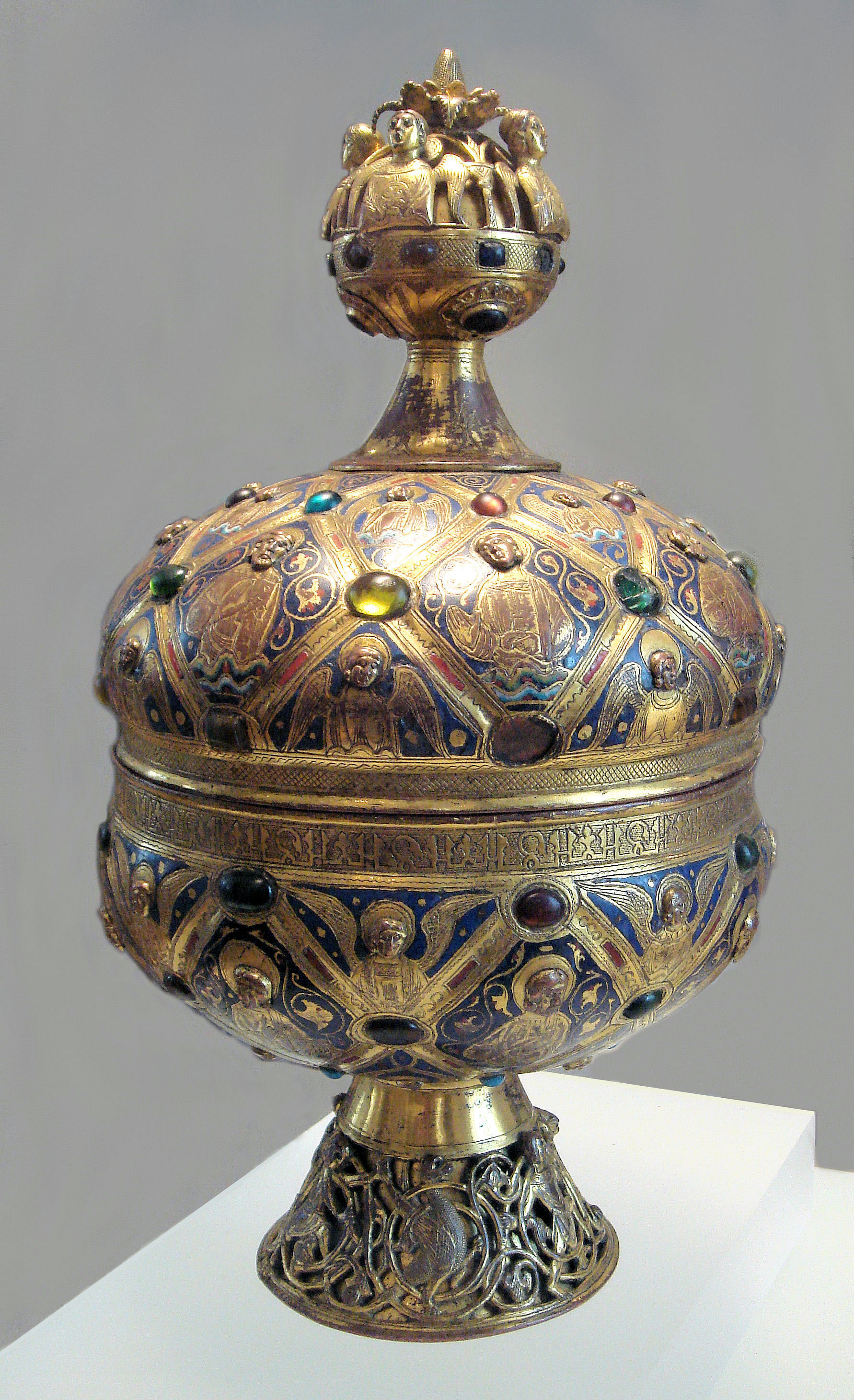
Limoges ciborium with champlevé enamel, and center rim in pseudo-Kufic script, circa 1200.

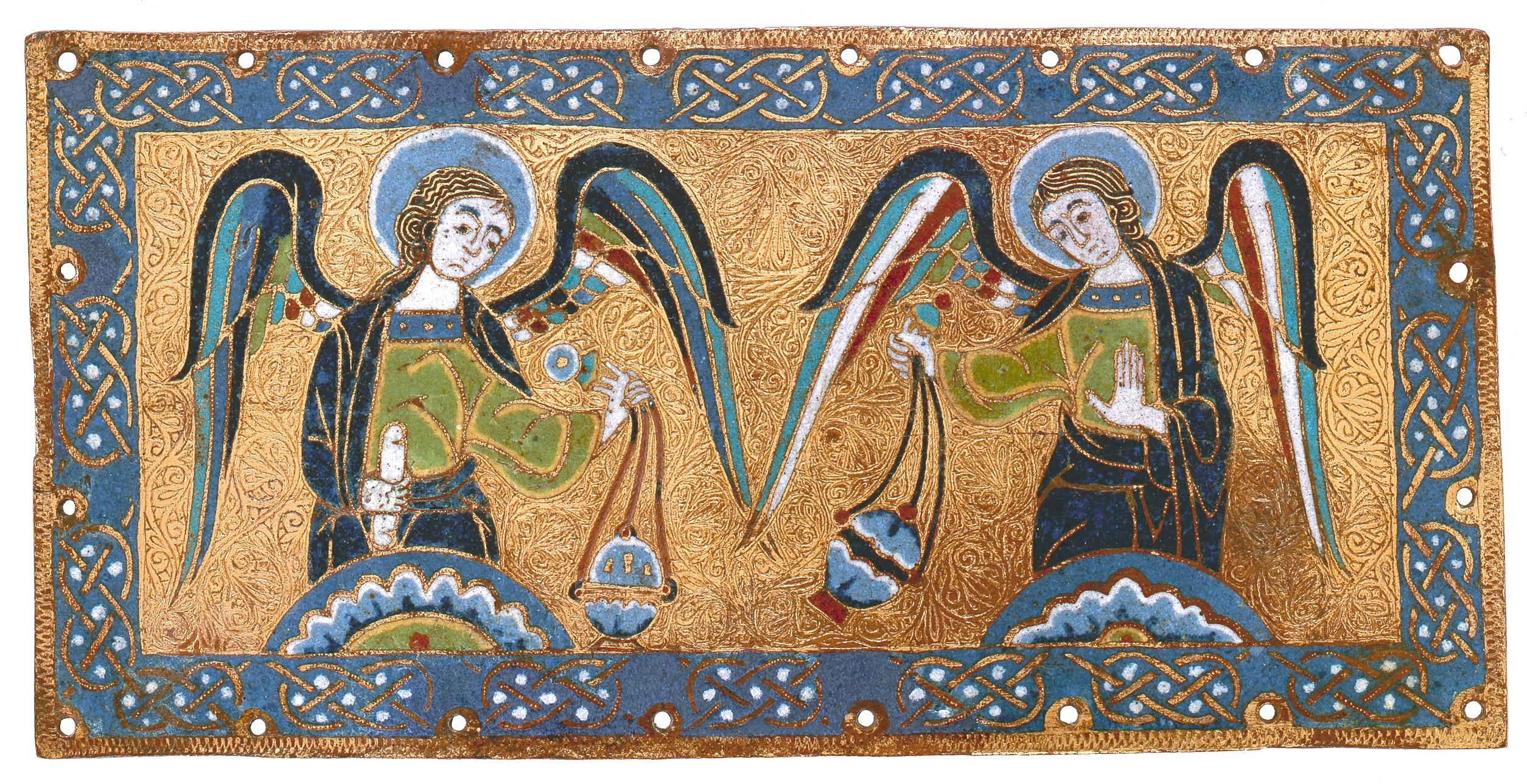
Panel with the figures in enamel and the gilded background vermiculated, 1170s.

Limoges was already the largest and most famous, but not the most high quality, European centre of champlevé vitreous enamel production by the 12th century; its works were known as Opus de Limogia or Labor Limogiae. The town's main competitors in the price-conscious market were northern Spanish workshops, and Limoges work shows signs of Spanish and Islamic influence from very early on; it has been speculated that there was movement of workers between the two regions. The later vermiculated style and pseudo-Kufic borders are two examples of such influence. Some of the early Limoges enamel pieces display a band in pseudo-Kufic script, which "was a recurrent ornamental feature in Limoges and had long been adopted in Aquitaine".

Champlevé plaques and "chasse caskets" or reliquaries on copper were eventually almost mass-produced and affordable by parish churches and the gentry. However, the highest quality champlevé work came from the Mosan Valley, in pieces such as the Stavelot Triptych, and later the basse-taille enamellers of Paris, Siena and elsewhere led the top end of the enamel market, often with bases in precious metal; almost all these pieces have been melted down at some point. But Limoges still received orders for important pieces for cathedrals or royal patrons, especially in the 12th and 13th centuries, and there were a range of qualities of work available. The industry was already in decline by 1370, when the brutal sack of the city after the Siege of Limoges by the English, led by Edward the Black Prince, effectively ended it. By then, goldsmiths in larger centres had mostly turned to other techniques such as basse-taille.

=== Techniques ===
Limoges enamel was usually applied on a copper base, but also sometimes on silver or gold. Preservation is often excellent due to the toughness of the material employed, and the cheaper Limoges works on copper have survived at a far greater rate than courtly work on precious metals, which were nearly all recycled for their materials at some point. The parts not covered in enamel were generally gilded; there were two basic styles. In the first, the more common but only introduced around 1200, the figures were gilded and often at least partly in relief, while the backgrounds were mainly in coloured enamels. In the other, this was reversed, and the figures were enamels, against a gilded background.

The gilded areas were also marked with incised lines, depicting the faces and clothes of figures or patterns in the backgrounds (this last known as the vermiculated style). Pieces were often decorated with jewels, usually imitations in enamel or glass in surviving pieces, and the multicoloured roundels in many of the backgrounds can be understood as imitation gems. From about 1200, blue, with the gold of the gilded areas, was the predominant colour in the Limoges palette. In medieval art blue was notoriously expensive in other media such as painting, but relatively easy to achieve in both enamel and stained glass, whose makers took full advantage of this.

The smaller relief elements were mainly made by stamping into dies carrying the design of details like the heads of figures that are otherwise flat; where whole figures are in relief they are usually made from a separate piece of copper which is first pushed out from behind to make the rough shape, then finished by working on the front. These were attached to the main piece with copper rivets, the round heads of which can usually be easily seen. In some pieces, especially those such as crosier heads with a three dimensional shape that is the same on two sides, the whole body was hammered into metal matrices carrying the design. The two sides were then most likely to be soldered together.

=== Growth ===
The growth of the Limoges industry and its reputation in the 12th century appears to have owed much to the Grandmontines, a monastic order whose mother house of Grandmont was outside the city. The order grew rapidly after the death of its founder, Saint Stephen of Muret in 1124, and was patronized by King Henry II of England. It is no longer thought that there was an enamel workshop in the abbey of Grandmont itself; instead the secular workshops of Limoges were patronized. The order had little land and was poor, as well as its austere rule on the face of it discouraging spending on art; it did not use monumental sculpture. Nonetheless, enamels were sent to the new houses springing up, mainly in France.

Pope Innocent III (1198–1216), who visited Grandmont twice, commissioned Limoges work for Rome: a reliquary for his titular church and work for the shrine of Saint Peter in Saint Peter's Basilica, effectively the most prestigious setting in the Western Church. The 4th Lateran Council, convened by Innocent, specified that Limoges enamel was suitable for one of the two pyxes every church was required to have (although it was not considered an appropriate material for chalices, which Catholic regulations still generally require to be at least plated in precious metal).

Other factors in spreading the reputation of Limoges work were that Limoges was on a main pilgrimage route to Santiago de Compostela, and was also patronized by the Knights Templar. Pieces were given as gifts as far afield as the Crusader Kingdoms of the Holy Land and Scandinavia, and have been preserved at Novgorod in Russia.

=== Uses ===
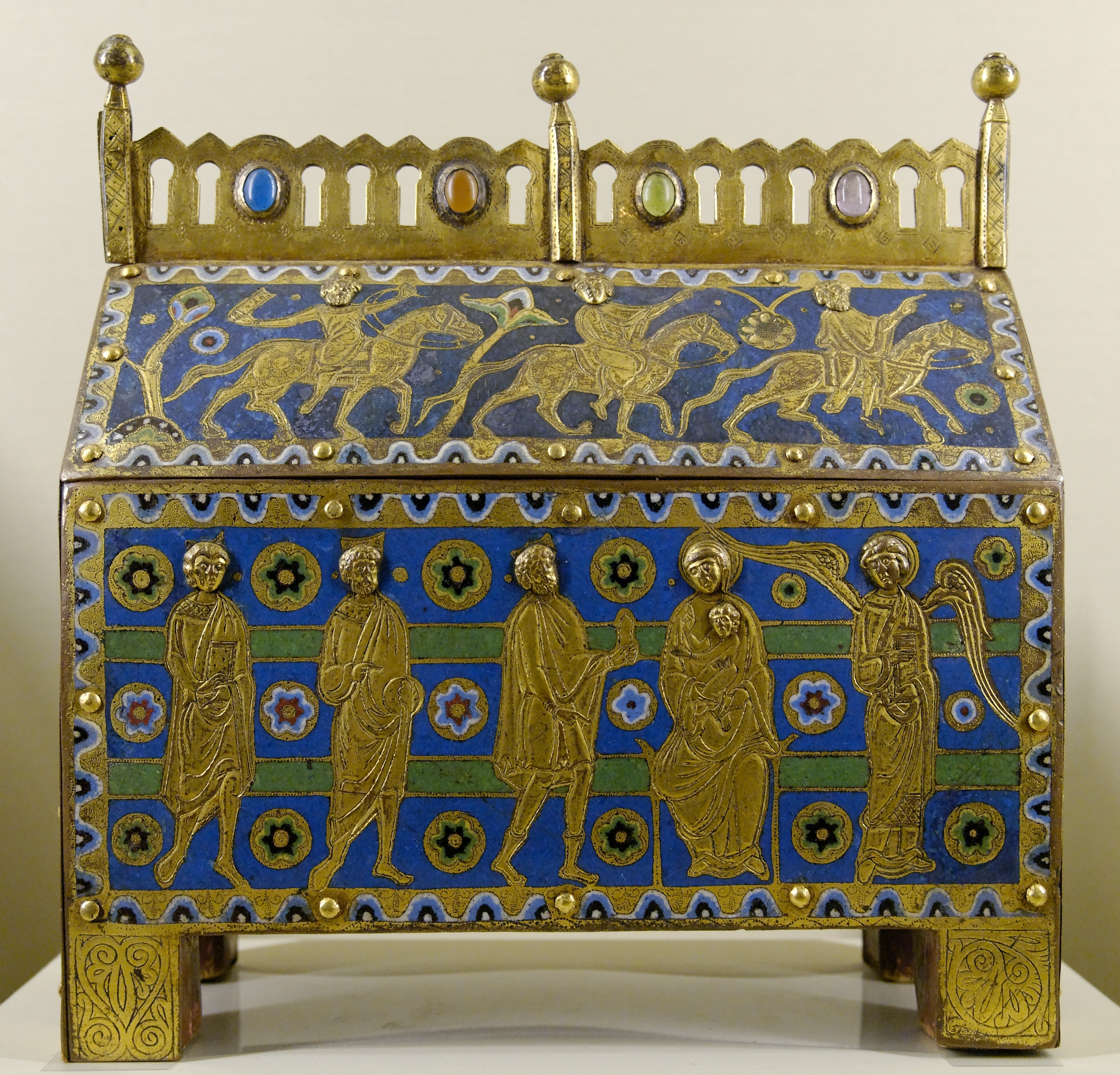
Chasse reliquary with the Three Kings, c. 1200.

Apart from the caskets which are such a large part of production throughout the period, there were many other types of objects made in Limoges enamel. Those made for church use have had a better chance of surviving, and in the early part of the period probably predominated. Some types of objects, such as candlesticks, which are usually small with a pricket, and ornamental medallions for chests, usually have secular or neutral decoration and were probably made the same for both markets. In the later period other objects can have distinctly secular decoration, such as chivalric scenes of knights in combat, or rarer scenes of courtly love. Religious book-covers (or treasure bindings) were made in numbers throughout the period, usually in pairs of plaques which have rarely survived together; God the Father and the Crucifixion of Christ are common subjects.

Other subjects that appear in Limoges enamel rather more often than in other religious art of the period include the life of Saint Valerie of Limoges, a local heroine, as well as the martyrdom of Saint Thomas Becket, whose cult was vigorously promoted by the church after his death, including the distribution of secondary relics (pieces of his clothes soaked in his diluted blood) around Europe. That there are more than twenty Limoges chasses showing the story of the Three Magi has slightly puzzled art historians. Their relics were "translated" from Milan to Cologne in 1164, and it has been suggested that parts of the masonry from the old shrine in Milan were available as relics. In subjects like these, with many surviving examples, the depictions are often closely similar, or fall into groups, suggesting shared designs, and perhaps different workshops using the same patterns.

In the 13th century there was a fashion for the tops of elite tombs to have an enamel and metal panel with an effigy of the deceased, which was often in relief. Two children of Saint Louis IX (1214–1270) who died young had such tombs in Royaumont Abbey outside Paris (now in the Basilica of Saint-Denis), and a number of tombs of bishops and great nobles are recorded; few survived the French Revolution. This was part of a trend for late Limoges work to become increasingly sculptural, often with only small touches in enamel. The number of secular pieces, or those that have survived, increased in the later period, including candlesticks, medallion plaques for ornamenting chests and other things, and gemellions, bowls for ceremonial hand-washing that came in pairs, servants pouring over the hands from one into the other.

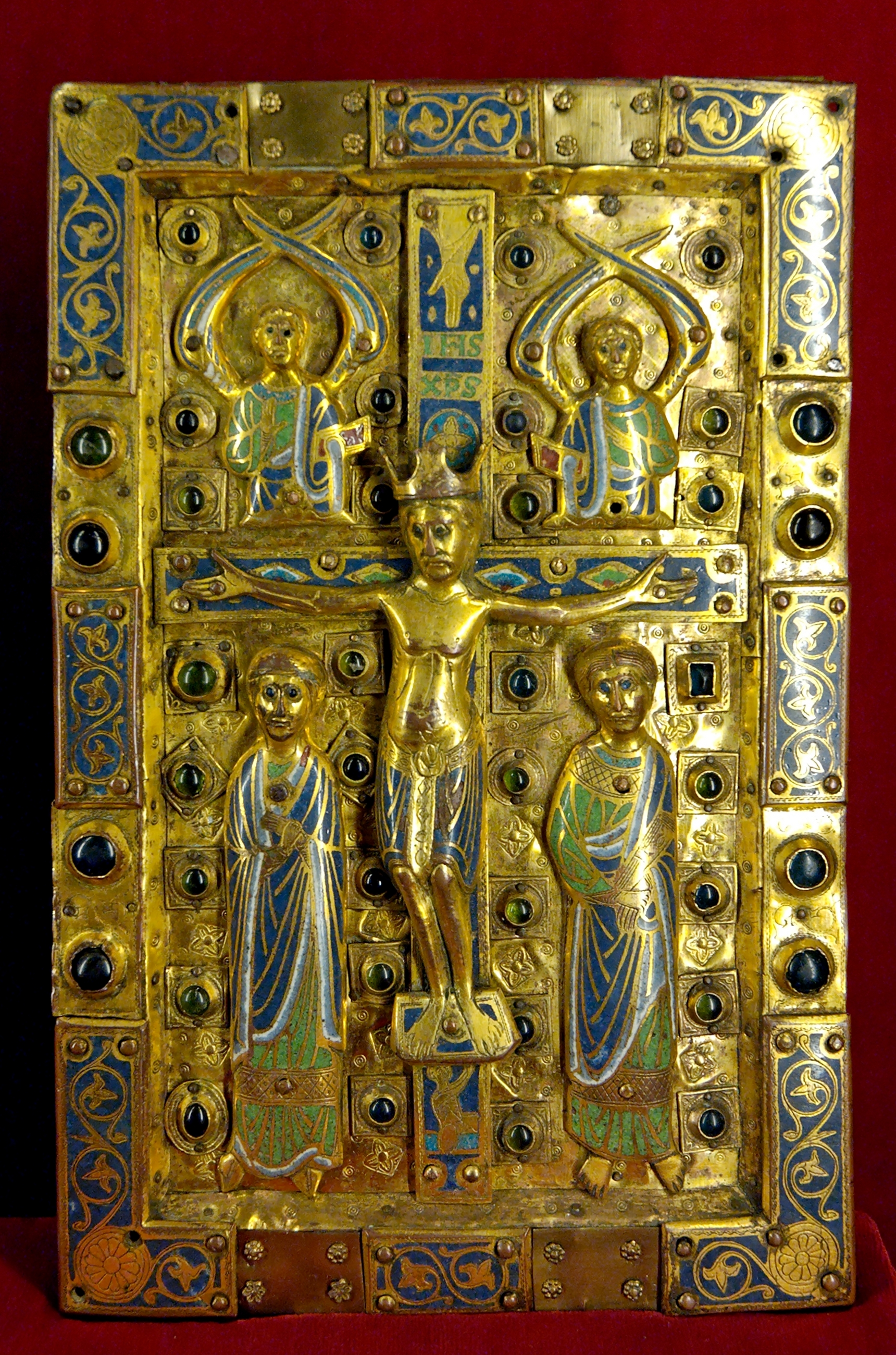
Book-cover plaque with appliqué enamelled figures, 13th century

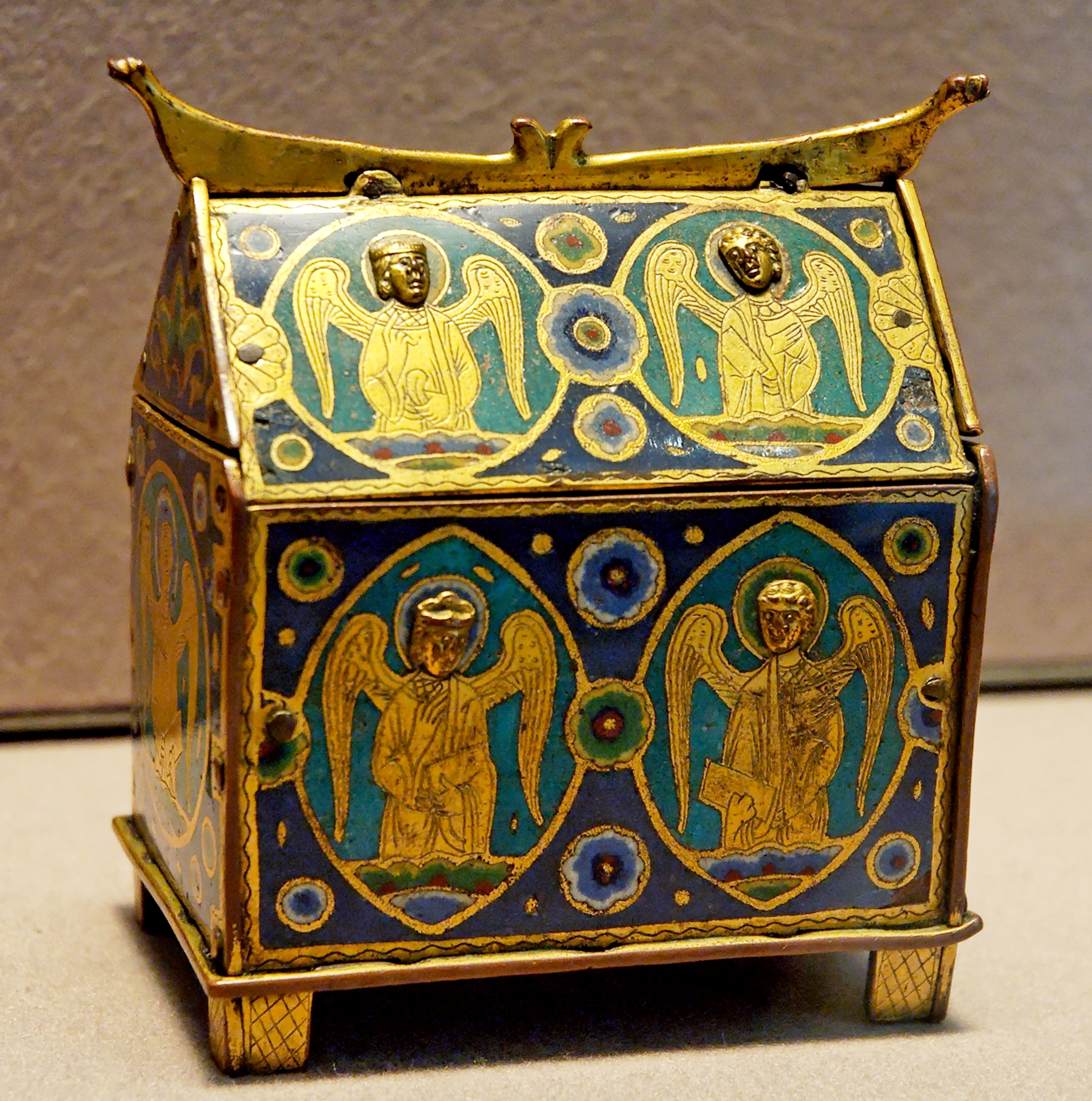
Typical medieval Limoges chasse casket, in this case a chrismatory rather than a reliquary, 13th century.

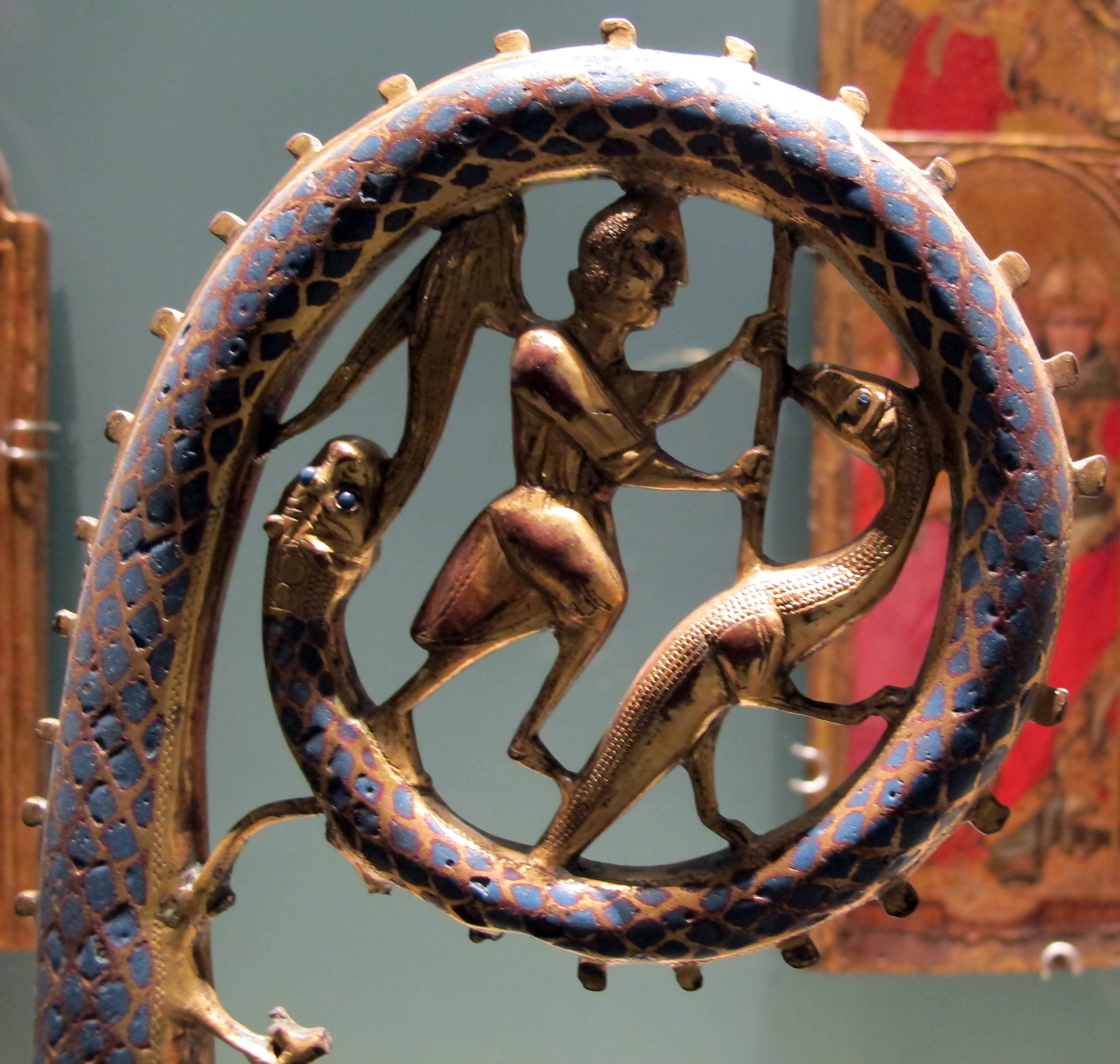
Detail of a crosier, c. 1230s

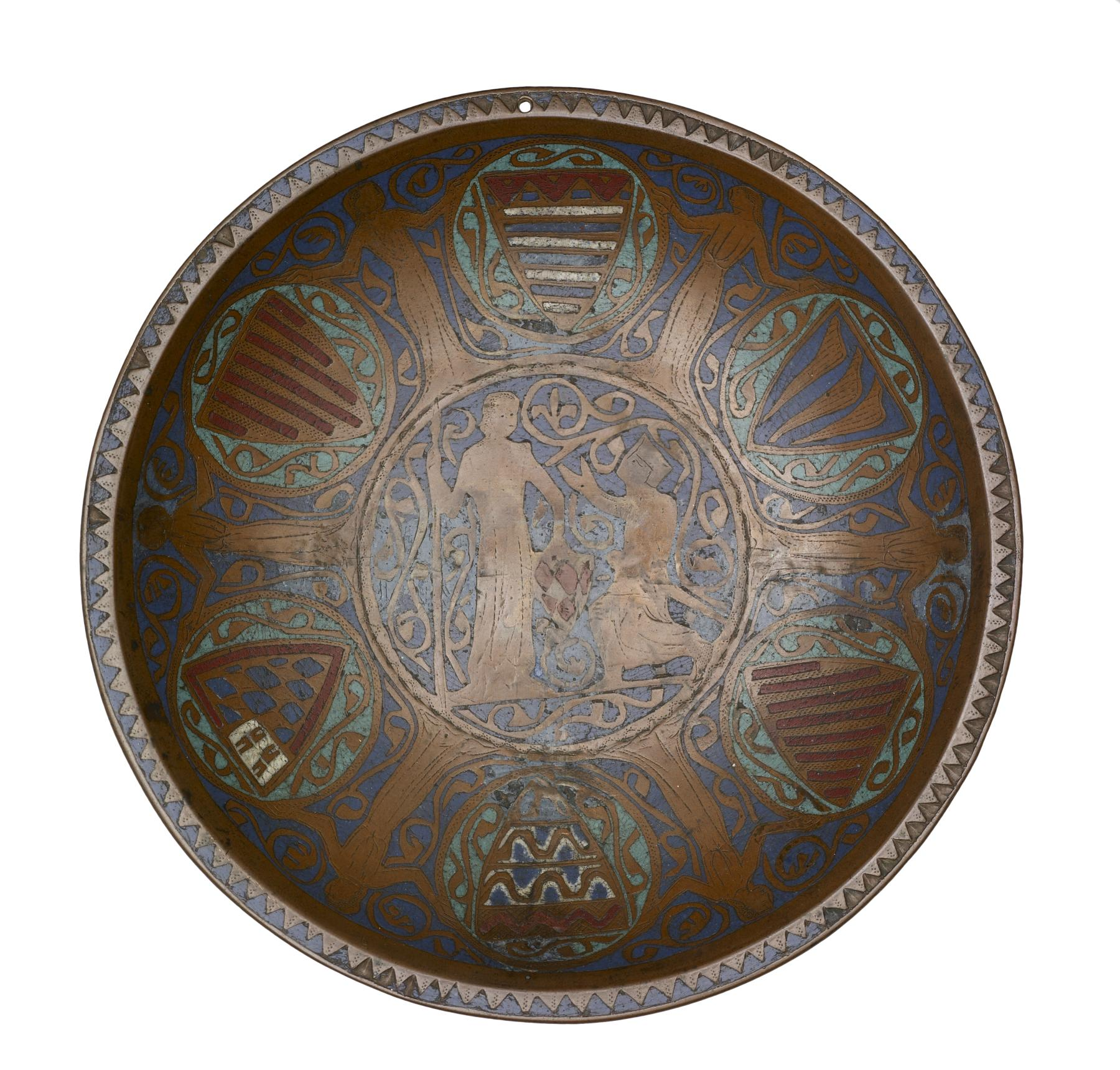
Gemellion with knight kneeling before a lady, and heraldry, 2nd half 13th century. Any gilding has worn off.

== Renaissance painted enamel ==
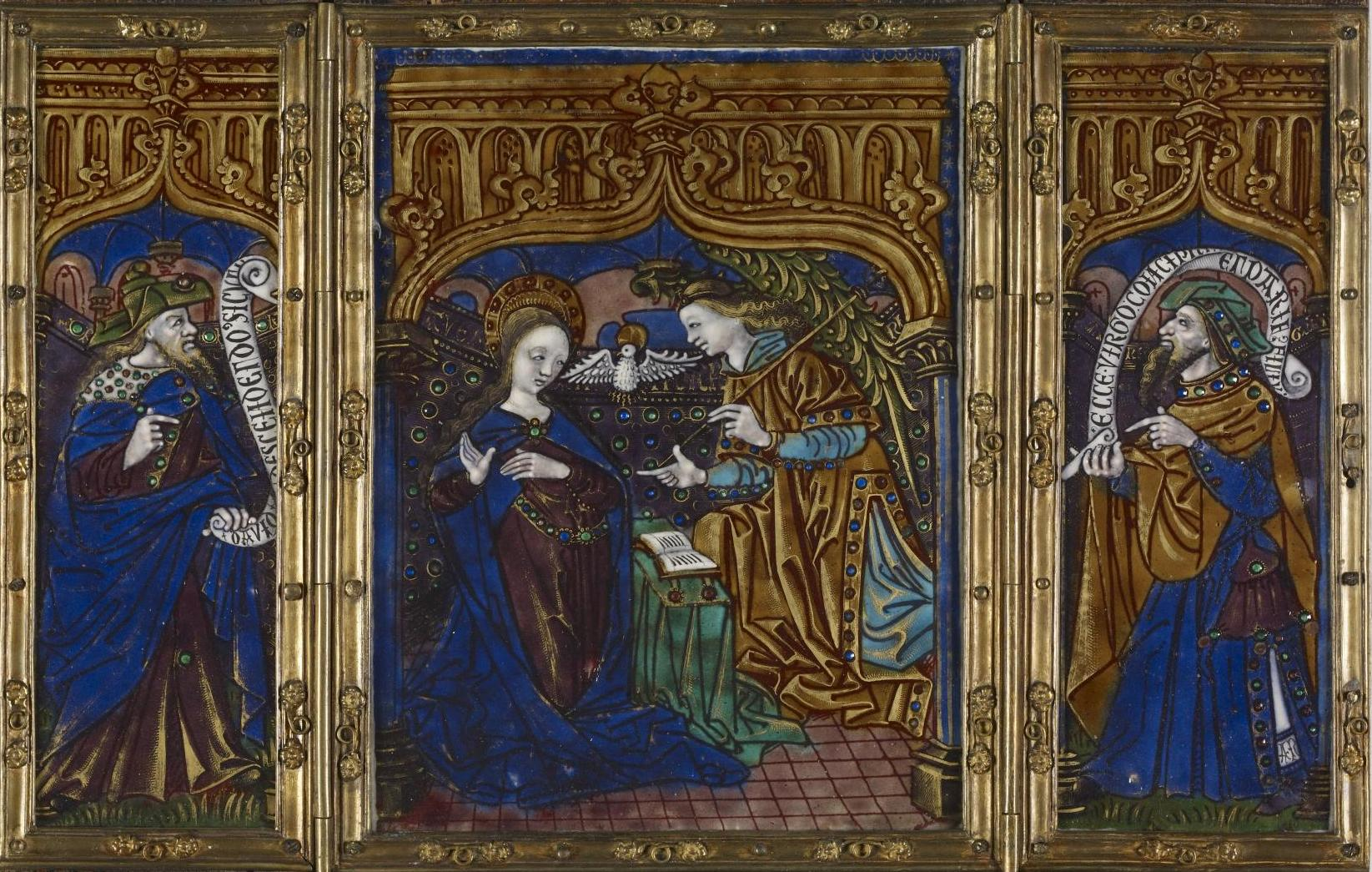
Master of the Orléans Triptych, the Baltimore Triptych; Annunciation with the Prophets David and Isaiah, about 1500

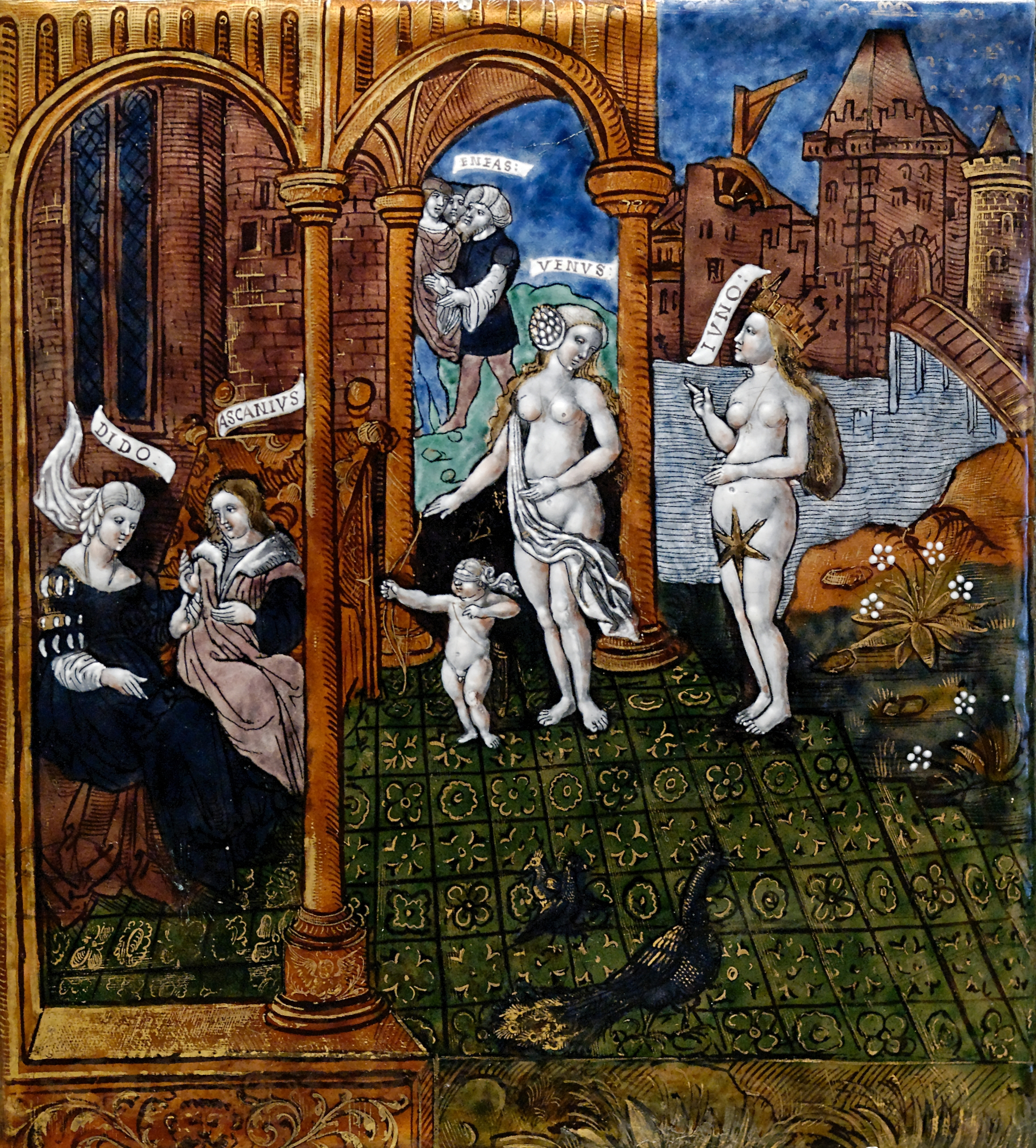
Painted plaque, c. 1530, with Venus, Juno and Aeneas, Aeneid Master, 1530s

The painted enamel technique appeared during the mid-15th century, perhaps first in the Netherlands, soon followed by Limoges during the reign of Louis XI (1461–1483). The first significant master, who goes by the name Monvaerni, or Pseudo-Monvaerni as the name is now known to be based on the misreading of an inscription, worked in the last decades of the century. He was followed by the unknown artists called the "Master of the Louis XII Triptych", after a piece in Victoria and Albert Museum, and the "Master of the Orléans Triptych", who created a number of religious pieces before about 1515 in a style still based on the painting of the previous century. These were too small for churches and evidently used for private devotions, perhaps especially for frequent travellers.

The technique flourished in various Limoges workshops throughout the 16th century, enjoying privileges from the king that gave it almost a monopoly in France. In addition, from the time of Louis XI the ability to attain the title of master in the enamellers' guild was confined to a few families by royal edicts. Enamels were produced in workshops which often persisted in the same family for several generations, and are often signed in the enamel, or identifiable, at least as far as the family or workshop, by punch marks on the back of panels, as well as by style.

At least initially, these were very high-status objects for the refined taste of the court and other wealthy collectors, with wealthy townsmen adding to the customer base from the 1530s, as the industry expanded. Unlike medieval Limoges champlevé, these enamels were made for a market mainly restricted to France, though some pieces were commissioned from Germany. While the medieval champlevé of Limoges competed with a number of other centres around Europe, in the 16th century there was really no other city producing any quantity of large pictorial enamels in a Mannerist style. Some pieces of Murano glass were partly painted in a broadly equivalent style.

By 1580 the style seems to have been falling from fashion, and Bernard Palissy, the creator of a complementary style in ceramics, wrote that "their art has become so cheap that they can barely make a living". Production continued into the 17th century, but at declining quality after the first decades. In the 18th century the role of luxury enamelware objects was largely superseded by European porcelain, but after some technical refinements enamel painting became widely used for small portrait miniatures, before this an English eccentricity. These were painted in many major cities where there were customers, and Limoges played only a minor part. Limoges was also an active centre of painted faience and later Limoges porcelain.

=== Style and technique ===
The new technique produced pieces painted with highly detailed figurative scenes or decorative schemes. As with Italian maiolica, to which in some ways Limoges painted enamel was a belated French riposte, the imagery tended to be drawn from classical mythology or allegory, though it includes religious scenes, often from the Old Testament. Many masters were becoming Huguenots (French Calvinists) over the century, and new printed Bibles moralisées, with illustrations by Bernard Salomon and others, were making accessible a large number of narrative scenes that were previously not widely familiar.

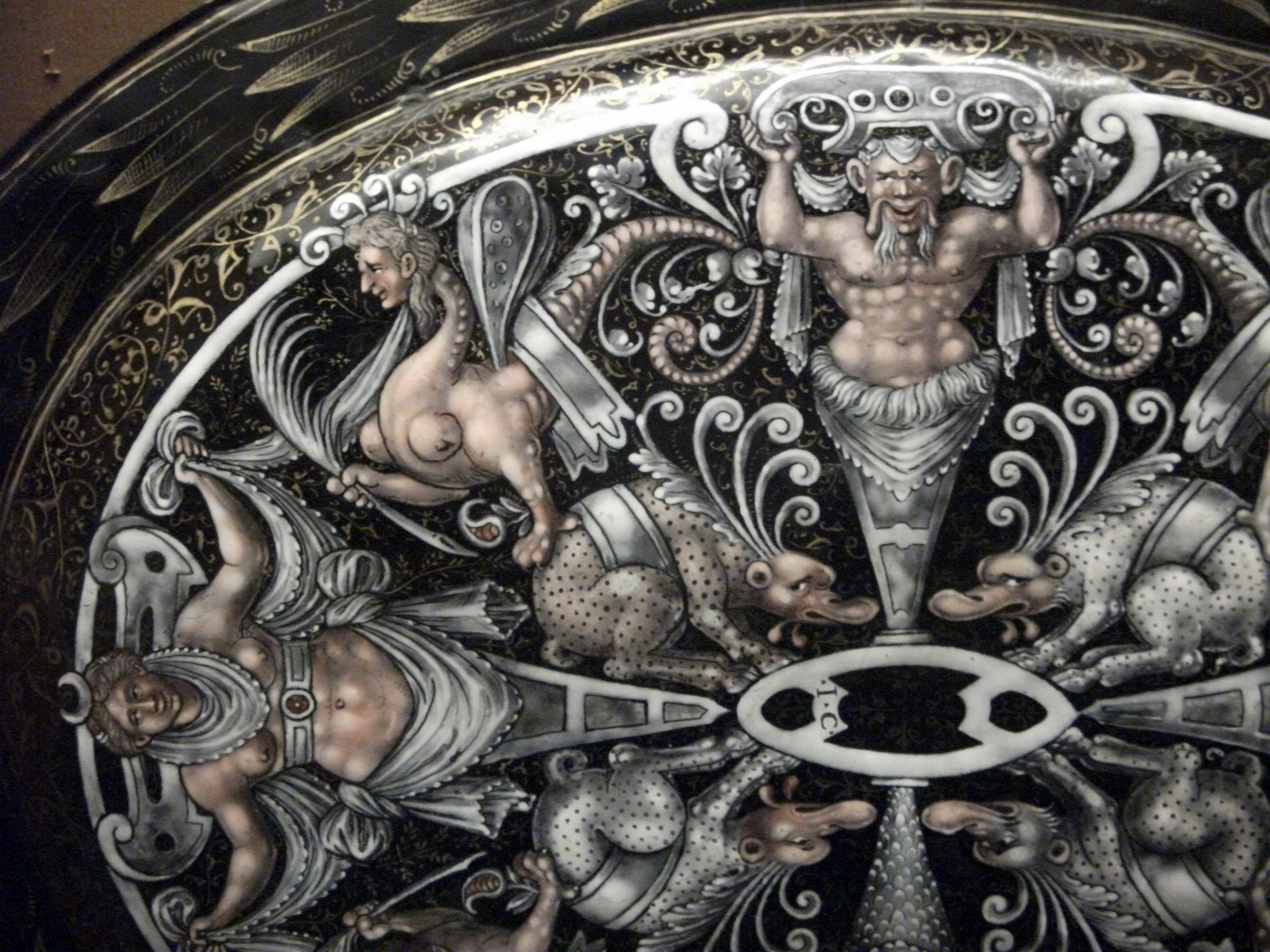
Detail of enamel dish, Limoges, mid-16th century, attributed to Jean de Court (marked "I.C." at centre), Waddesdon Bequest, British Museum

The compositions were mostly taken from German, French or Italian prints, especially for the larger scenes with many figures. Borders on the larger pieces are highly elaborate and use the full range of Mannerist ornament, diffused by ornament prints and other models. There is much strapwork and fantastic grotesques are often given a comic treatment. The jolly grotesques illustrated at right are on the reverse of a large dish whose main face shows a brightly-coloured depiction of the Destruction of Pharaoh's army in the Red Sea. Both designs are closely paralleled, without being exactly copied, in pieces in other collections, notably one in the Metropolitan Museum of Art in New York. The designs are also based on prints, but adapted by the enamellers for their pieces.

The introduction, around 1530, of the grisaille style, with most of the composition in black and white, may seem surprising in a medium which generally relied for its effect on a wide range of bright colours which could only be matched by pottery in the other media, such as metalwork, in which similar objects were made. Muted other colours, especially gold and pink for flesh, were often included. There may have been an influence from the black and white of the prints the designs were drawn from, and the style was probably much easier to fire. Grisaille areas were usually made by firing a coat of "black" enamel, in fact usually a very dark mulberry colour, sometimes a very dark blue, then adding a coat of white, and partially scratching this away before firing again. Highlights in white, gold, or other colours might then be added. Grisaille pieces dominated production in the approximate period between 1530 and 1560, and thereafter continued to be made alongside polychrome ones. It has been claimed that these pieces were "dark and sombre, reflecting the pessimism prevalent during the Reformation".

Enamels were still applied to bases of copper sheets; the construction of the complicated three dimensional shapes often now used could not use solder, which would not withstand the firing temperature. The back of the sheets also needed to be enameled, even where these would be invisible, to reduce buckling during firing; this unseen enamel is called "counterenamel" and used waste material from the painted sides. The technique required (if not in grisaille) multiple firings at closely controlled temperatures to fire the various colours, though the number of firings actually required has become a matter of some controversy in recent decades. Up to twenty was claimed by earlier writers, but a maximum of eight or nine now seems more likely. Mercury gilding was used for gold areas, very common in the borders; this and some other colours were only briefly fired, as the final stage.

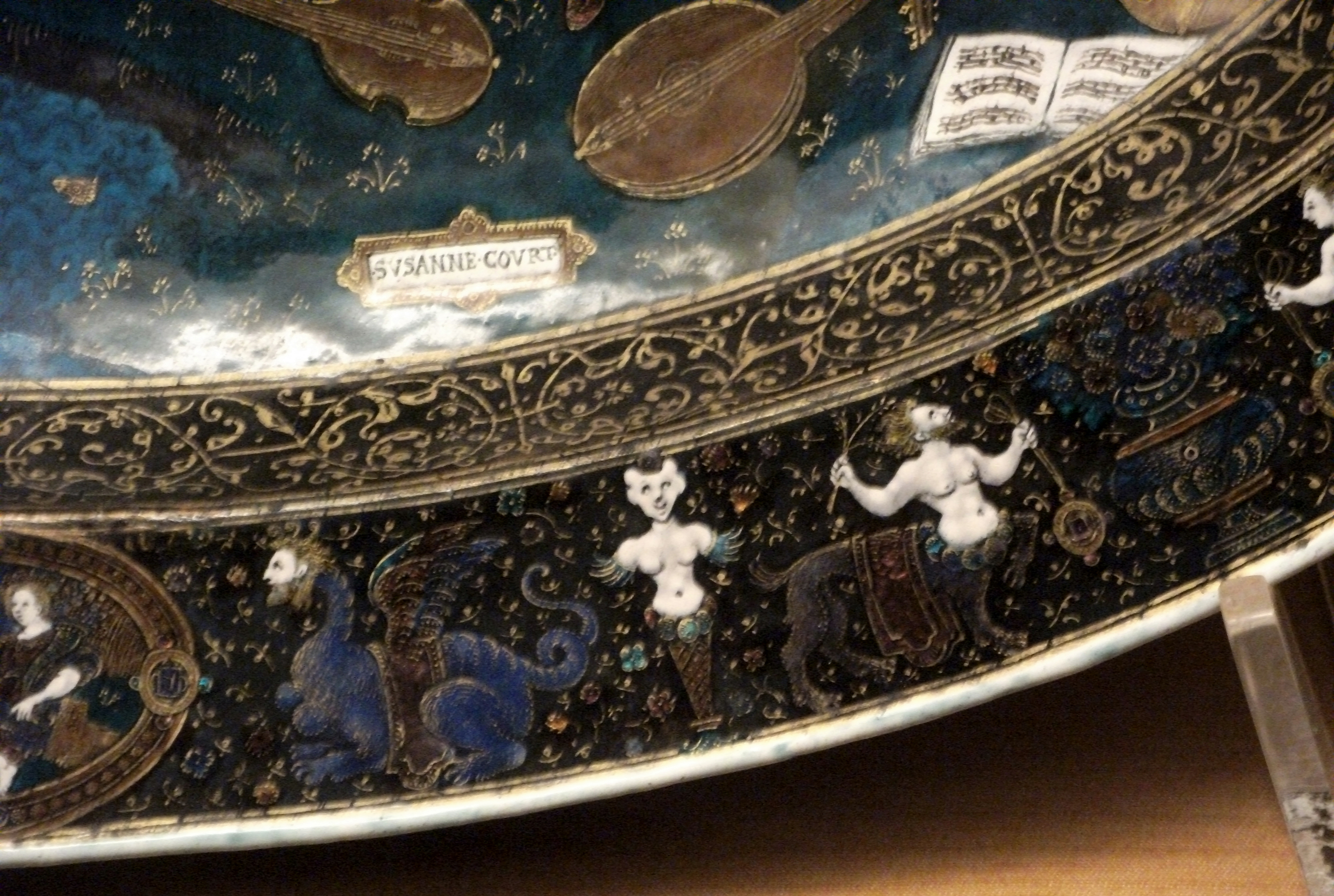
Signature of "Suzanne Court" on a charger

=== Artists ===
Given the royal privileges, enamel workshops tended to stay in the family, and are also rather poorly documented compared to painters; the various signatures and monograms on pieces have given art historians much to argue about. Hallmarks on the metal frames or setting can be helpful in giving dates. Léonard Limousin was the most famous of seven enamel artists of the Limousin family, whose signed and dated works stretch from 1532 to 1574. The Court/de Court family probably included most of Jean Court (active 1550s), Jean de Court (active 1560s and 1570s, also a successful portrait painter in oils), Suzanne de Court, perhaps active 1570s to 1620s, and Pierre Courteys (or Courtois), signing works from 1550 to 1568. The Pénicault, Laudin and Reymond or Raymond (Pierre Reymond) families were also prominent enamelists, the Laudins especially prominent in the 17th century, as the "last spark" of the Limoges tradition.

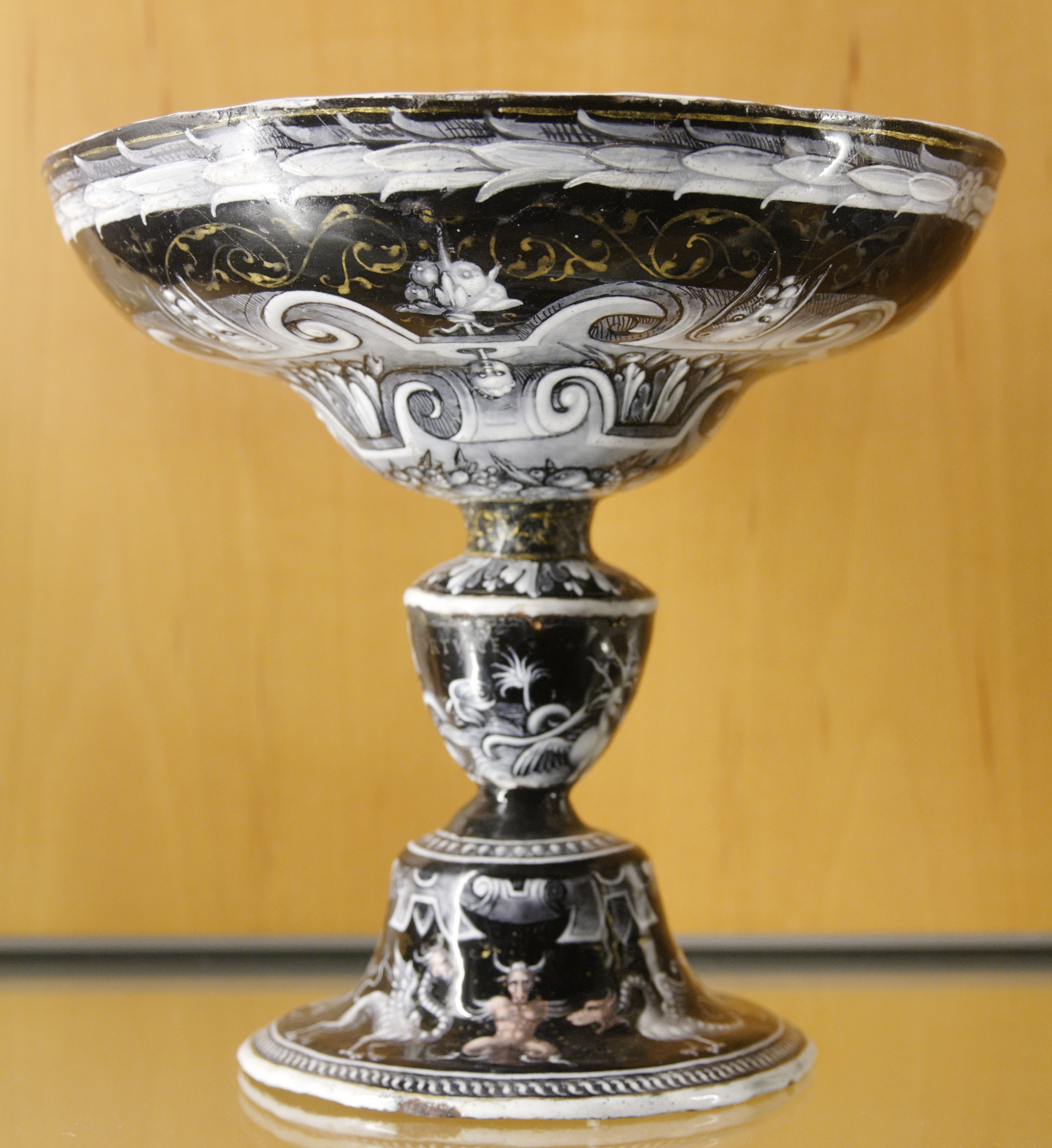
Tazza by Pierre Reymond

Some of these signatures (typically just initials in fact) may represent "from the firm/workshop of" rather than "painted by". Some individual enamel painters are also known from particular works, with others attributed to them based on their style; the illustration here is from a series on the Aeneid by the "Master of the Aeneid ", who made a large set of plaques around the 1530s, of which 74 are now widely dispersed in various collections. They copy the compositions of the woodcut illustrations first used in an edition of the works of Virgil published in Strasbourg in 1502, and then reused in Lyon editions in 1517 and 1529; there were 143 illustrations to the Aeneid in these, and none of the last three books have any surviving enamel versions. They may have decorated a small study, set into wood panelling as in the cabinet des emaux belonging to Queen Catherine de' Medici at her death in 1589, set with small enamel portraits.

The Aeneid series reflect the essentially Gothic style of the woodcuts copied, but were probably made when Léonard Limousin was already in the service of the king. His exposure to the Italian style of the First School of Fontainebleau was probably the key to the rapid adoption of sophisticated Mannerist style by Limoges artists, where it held sway for the rest of the century.

=== Uses ===
Enamels were made as objects such as candlesticks, dishes, vessels and mirror backs, and also as flat plaques to be included in other objects such as caskets. Although they were very often made in shapes for serving food and drink, the evidence suggests that they were not generally used for this, but kept among other objets d'art in reception rooms. As with medieval enamels, while some pieces were evidently made to order, others were probably made for stock to sell or distribute to the market. Hat badges became popular as the industry and clientele expanded; the grand preferred traditional jewellery for these.

The largest three-dimensional piece to survive is a grisaille "table fountain" 490 mm tall at Waddesdon Manor in England, dated 1552, purportedly made for Diane de Poitiers, mistress of Henri II of France. However, this may be a "composite" piece made up in the 18th and 19th centuries from a number of 16th century pieces, and with the joined initials of Henri and Diane added.

The Sibyls Casket in the Waddesdon Bequest in the British Museum (one of the better collections, and always on display) is an elaborate small locking casket with a framework of silver-gilt and gems, set with grisaille panels with touches of gold and flesh-tints. It represents the sophisticated court taste of about 1535, and was probably intended for a lady's jewels. Most such sets of enamel inserts have lost the settings they were intended for, but many are now in replacement frames added by the Paris dealers in the second half of the 19th century.

=== Collecting history ===
After a long period when they were very little collected, interest in painted Limoges revived in the first half of the 19th century, as part of a general Renaissance revival. The taste grew until late in the century, with Paris as the main market for gathering examples from chateaux, if necessary doing them up with the usual 19th-century audacity, and selling them to an increasingly international group of very wealthy collectors. The skills reacquired for repairs led to some downright forgeries. Art historians began to reconstruct the names and biographies behind the tangled evidence from signatures and styles, as well as imitations in ceramics from France and England.

From the mid-century large groups were included in appropriate exhibitions in Paris and London, and later the private collections mostly passed into museums; "the important collections of Limoges enamels are found today in a dozen museums":

- France: Louvre: Musée national du Moyen Âge (formerly Musée de Cluny, essentially champlevé), Paris: Château d'Écouen (Musée national de la Renaissance): Municipal Museum of Limoges.
- England (all London): British Museum, including the Waddesdon Bequest: Victoria and Albert Museum: Wallace Collection
- USA: Frick Collection, New York: Walters Art Gallery, Baltimore: Metropolitan Museum of Art, New York: Taft Museum of Art, Cincinnati.
- Russia: Hermitage Museum, Saint Petersburg.
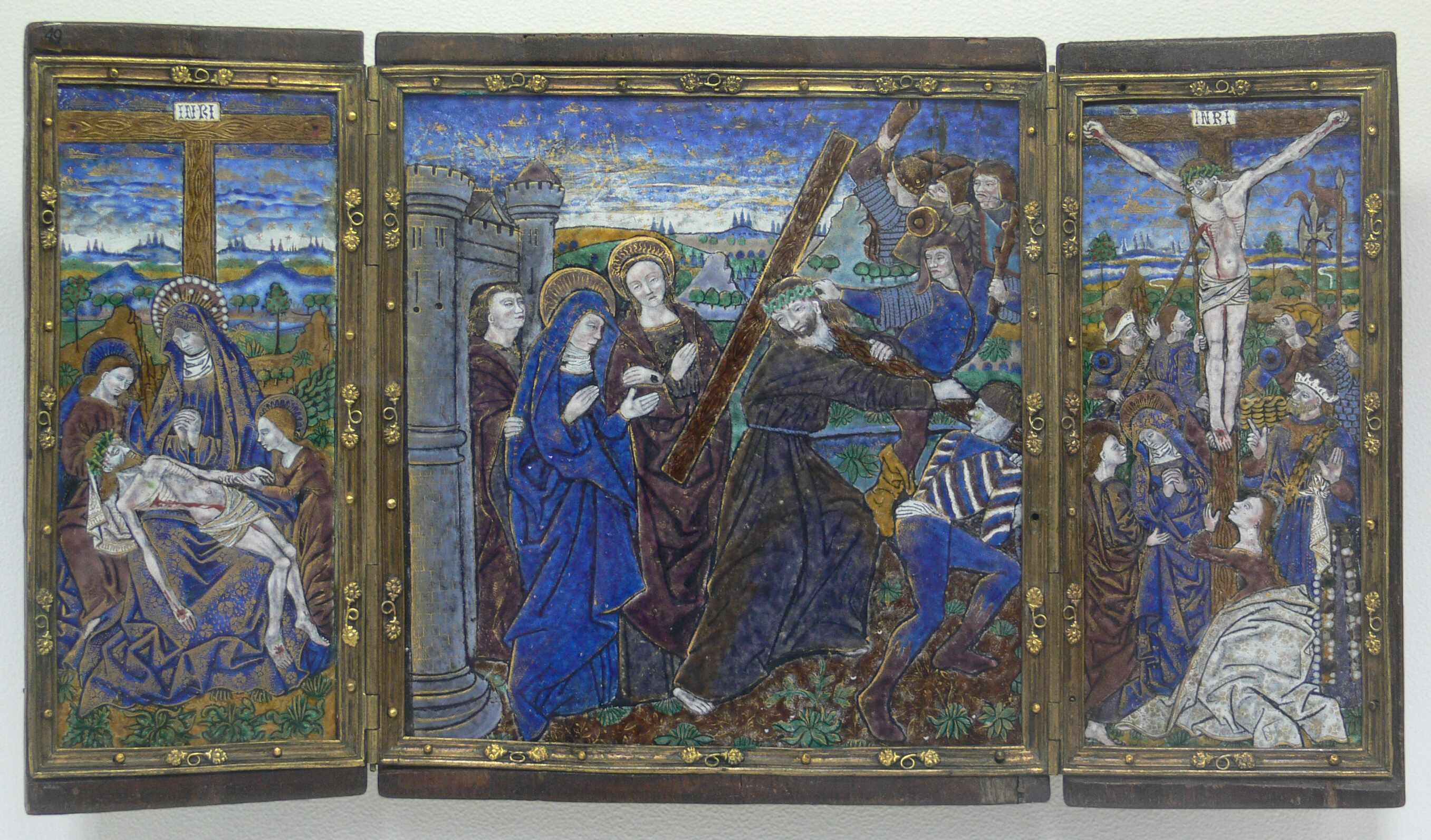
Late 15th century triptych, attributed to the Monvaerni workshop

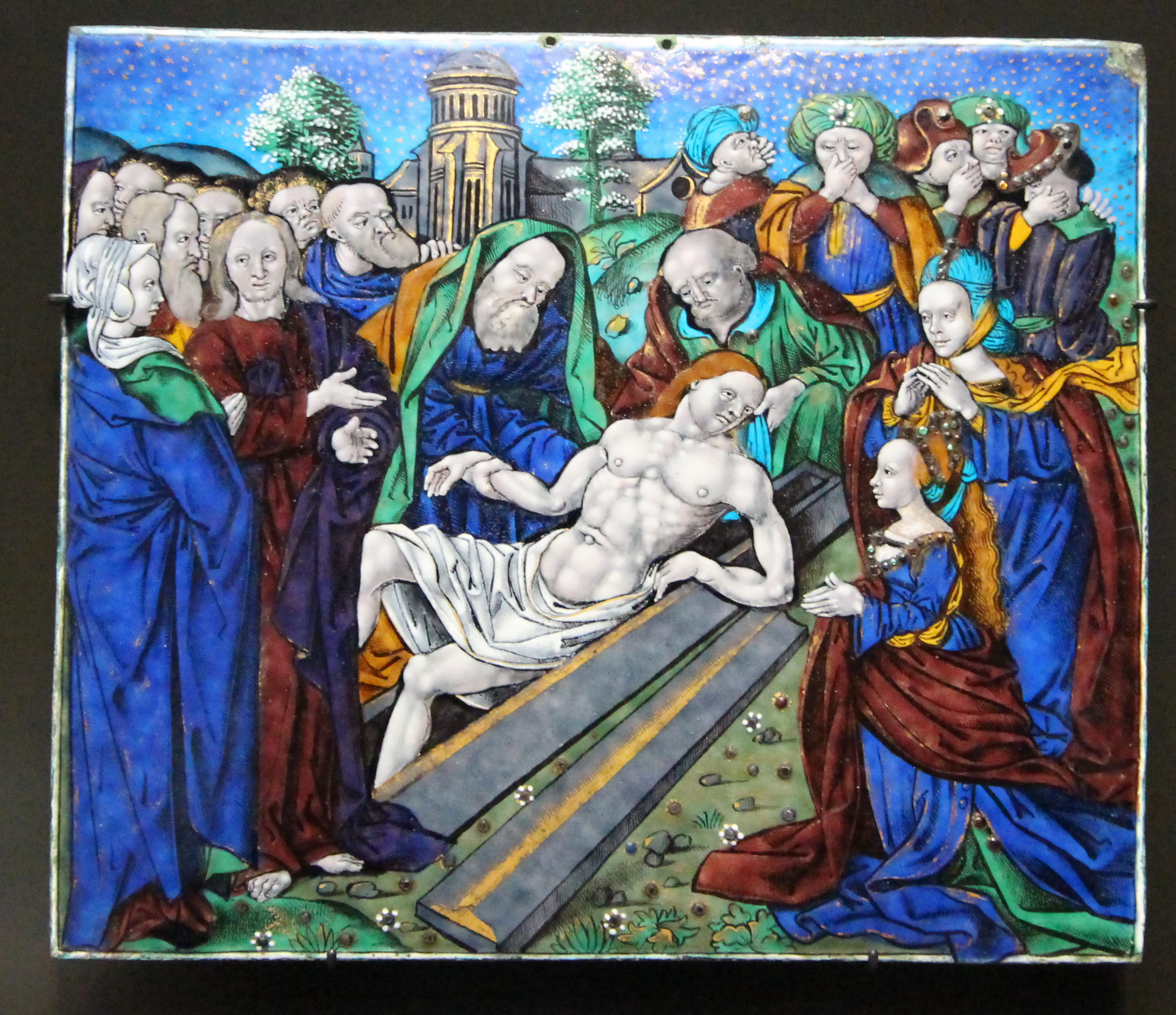
Plaque with Raising of Lazarus, Jean Penicault I, early 16th century

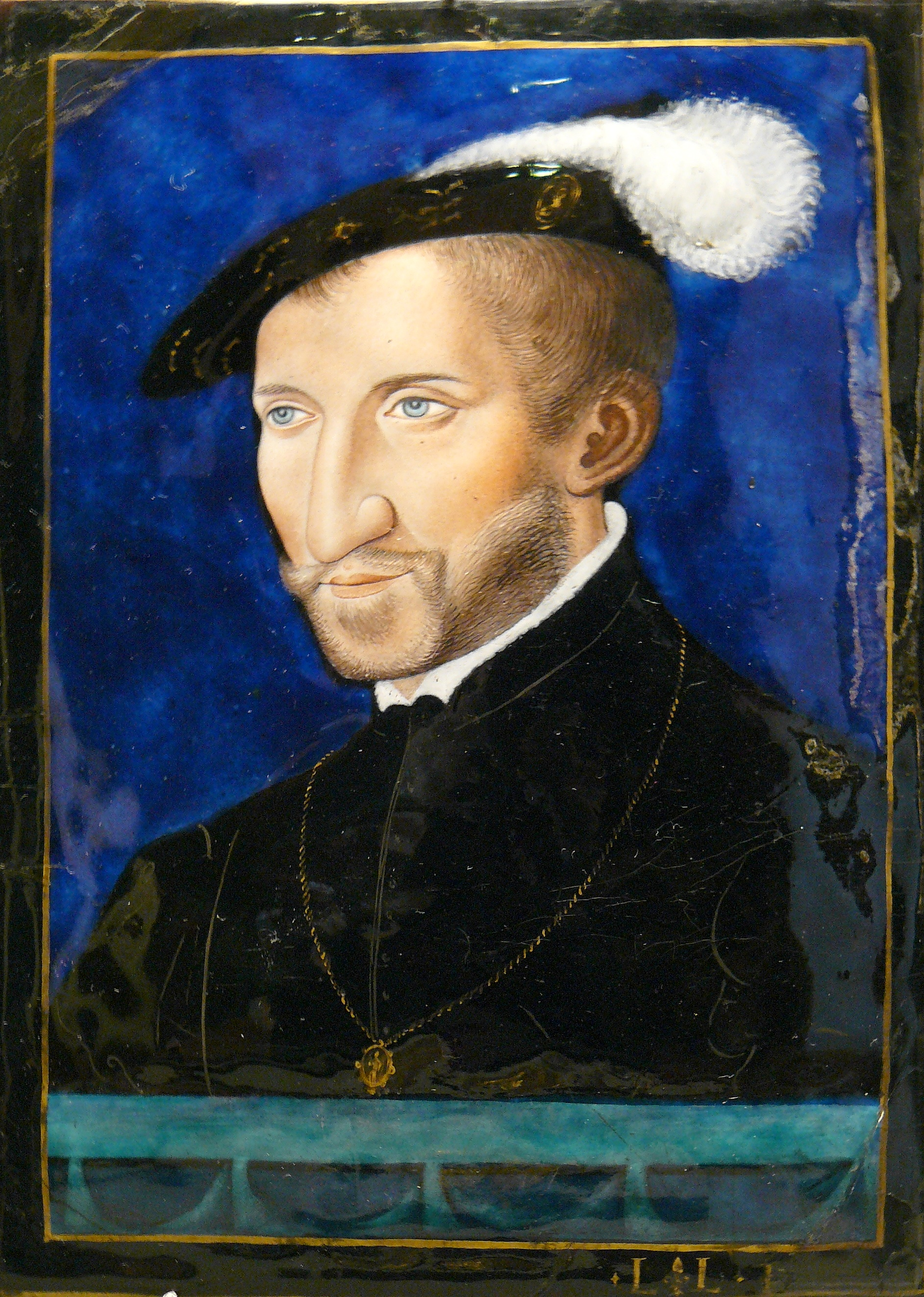
Portrait plaque by Léonard Limousin of Henry II of Navarre

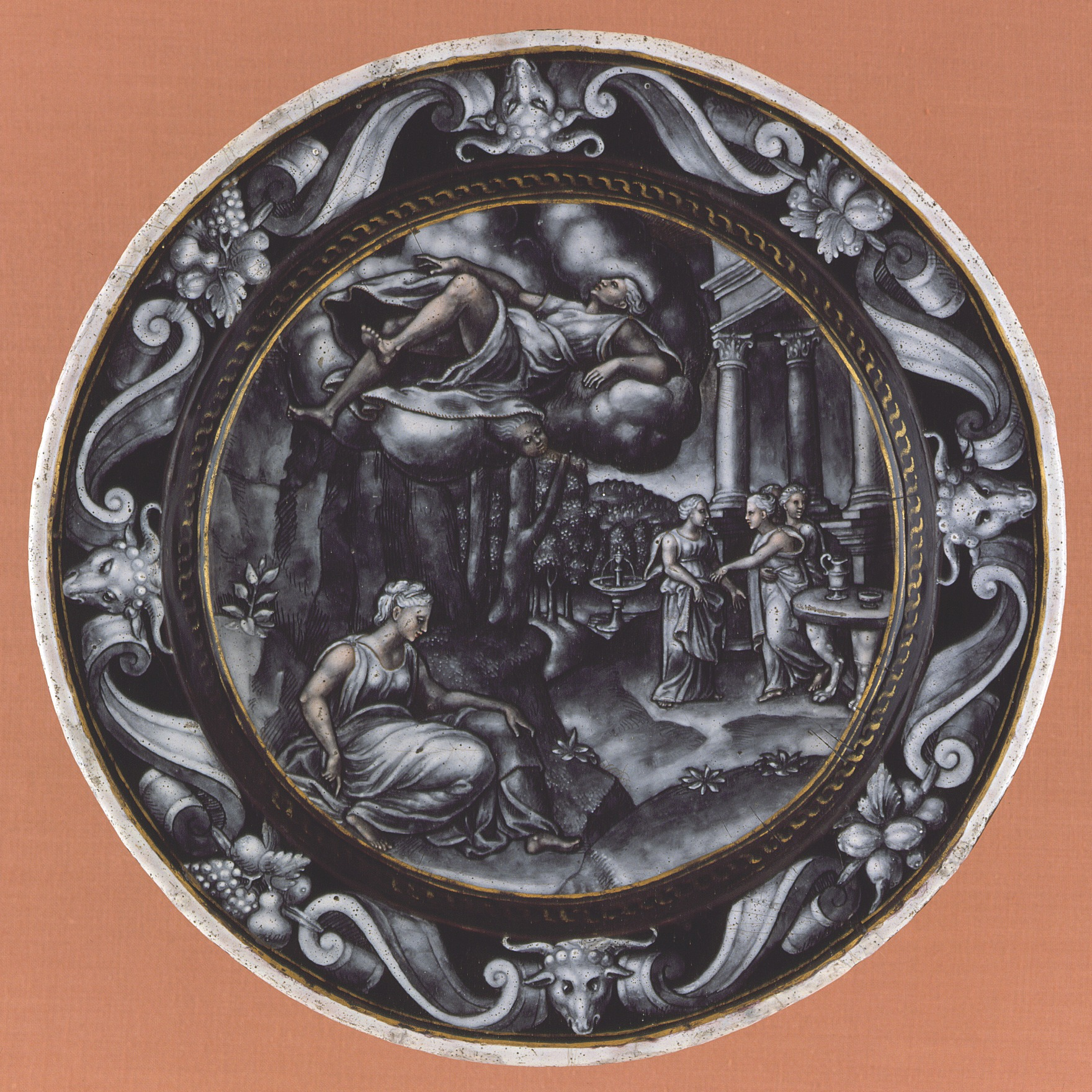
Grisaille plate with Psyche Carried by Zephyr to Cupid's Palace, Pierre Courteys, c. 1560

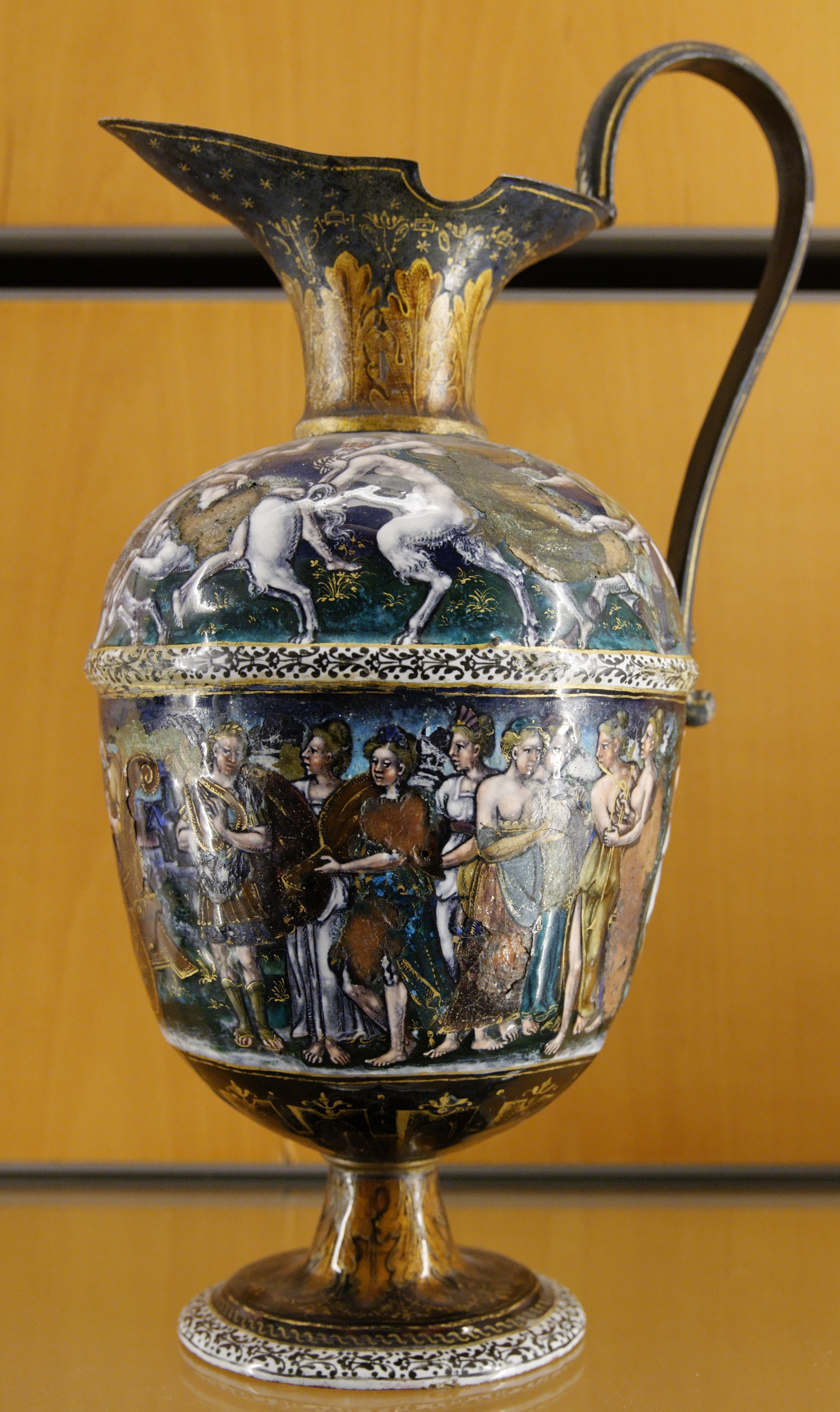
Ewer, around 1600

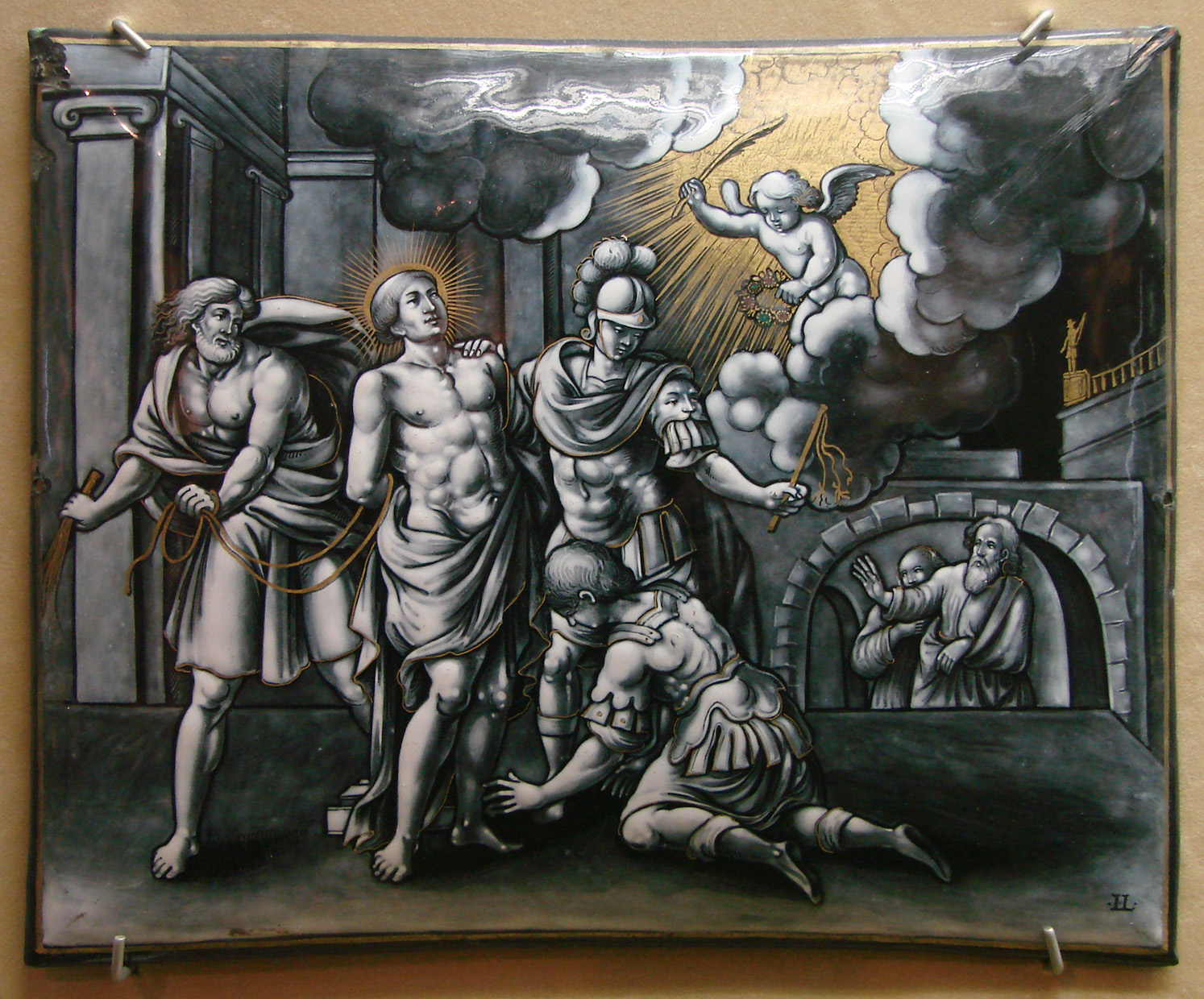
17th century painted grisaille plaque, from a large series for a church in Reims, Jules Laudin, c. 1663.

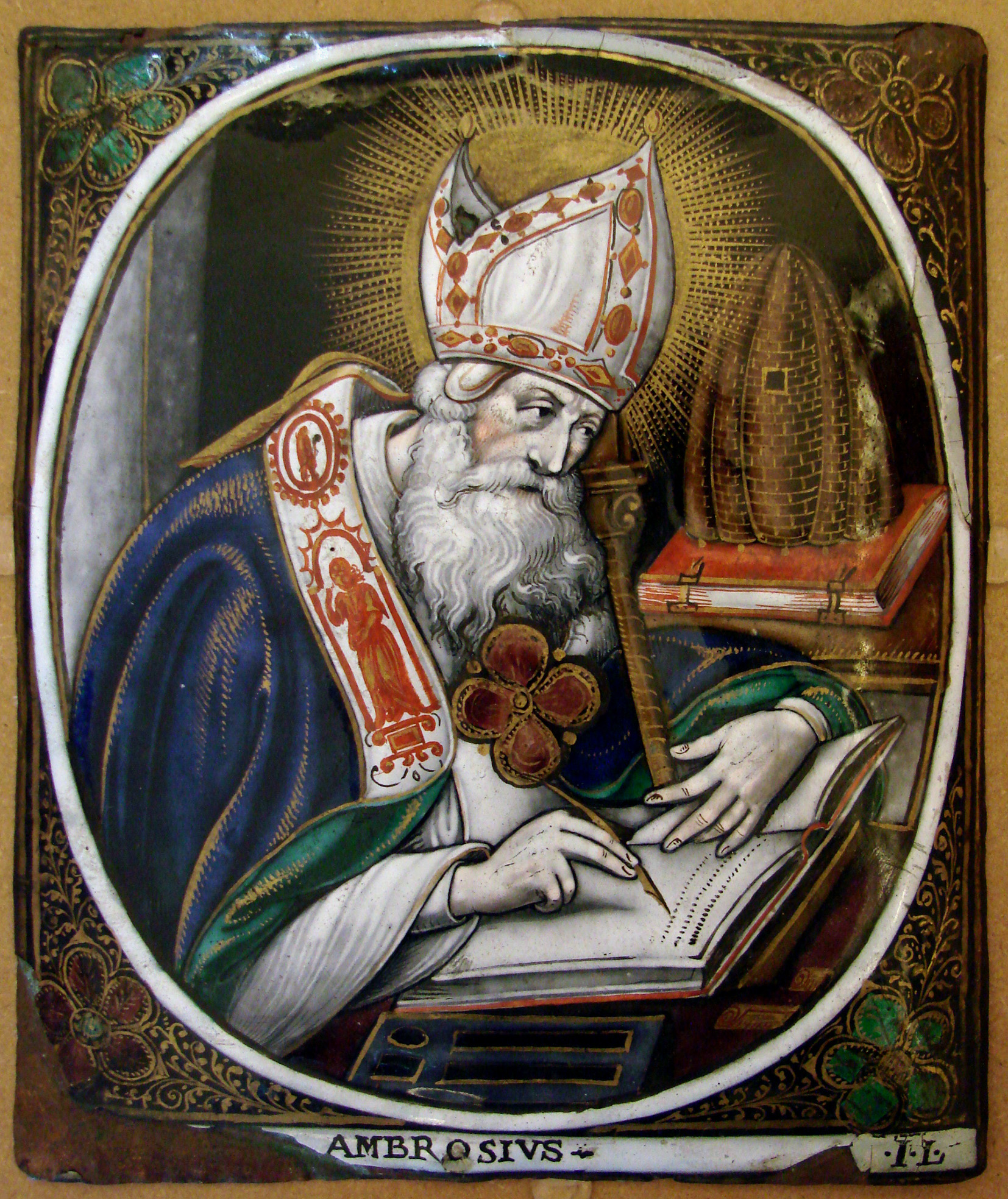
17th century painted plaque by Jacques I Laudin (1627-1695)

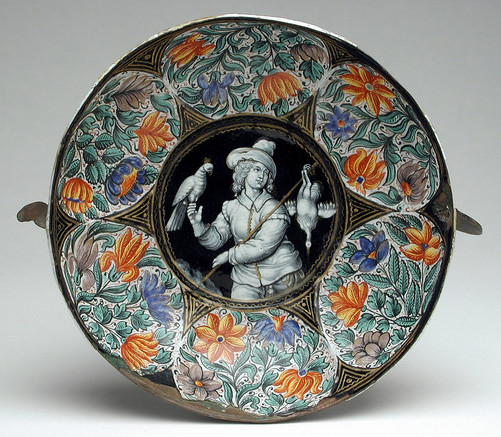
Plate, attributed to Jacques Laudin, 17th century

== Examples ==
=== Limoges Cross ===
This piece is the central plaque from a cross", from the first third of the 13th century. It is now in the San Francisco Legion of Honour. The uncarved area is gilded to help frame the enameled portions. This cross was probably used in the Abbey of St. Martial probably as a processional cross.

=== Spitzer Cross ===
The Spitzer Cross is a crucifix, made c.1190 in Limoges, in France, by an artisan known as the "Master of the Royal Plantagenet Workshop". The work is made from copper, engraved and gilded, and inlaid with champlevé Limoges enamel, with tones of blues, greens, yellow, reds and whites, and depicts Christ on the cross. It may have been made as a processional cross for the Abbey of Grandmont: similar crosses are held in other collections, including the Metropolitan Museum of Art.

=== Limoges Reliquary Casket ===
This reliquary casket depicts scenes from the death of Thomas Becket. St. Thomas Becket, Archbishop of Canterbury, was murdered in Canterbury Cathedral in 1170, supposedly on the wishes of King Henry II of England. Beckett was canonized as a saint within three years of his murder, and scenes from the life and death of Thomas Becket very quickly became a popular sources of inspiration for the artists of Limoges, that there are over 45 caskets surviving today. It is now in the San Francisco Legion of Honor in the Medieval Art Galleries.

The Becket Casket in London (illustrated at top) is another Limoges example; it is the largest surviving Becket casket, and possibly the oldest. It may have been made as few as ten years after Becket's murder.

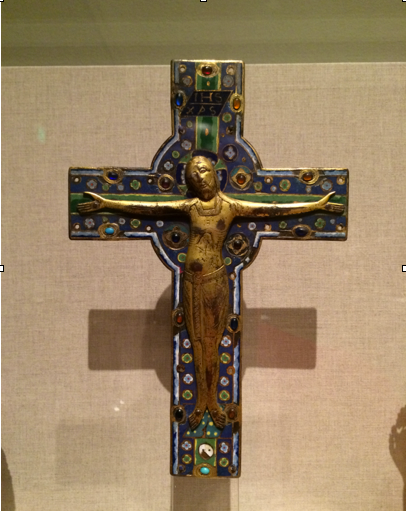
Limoges Cross

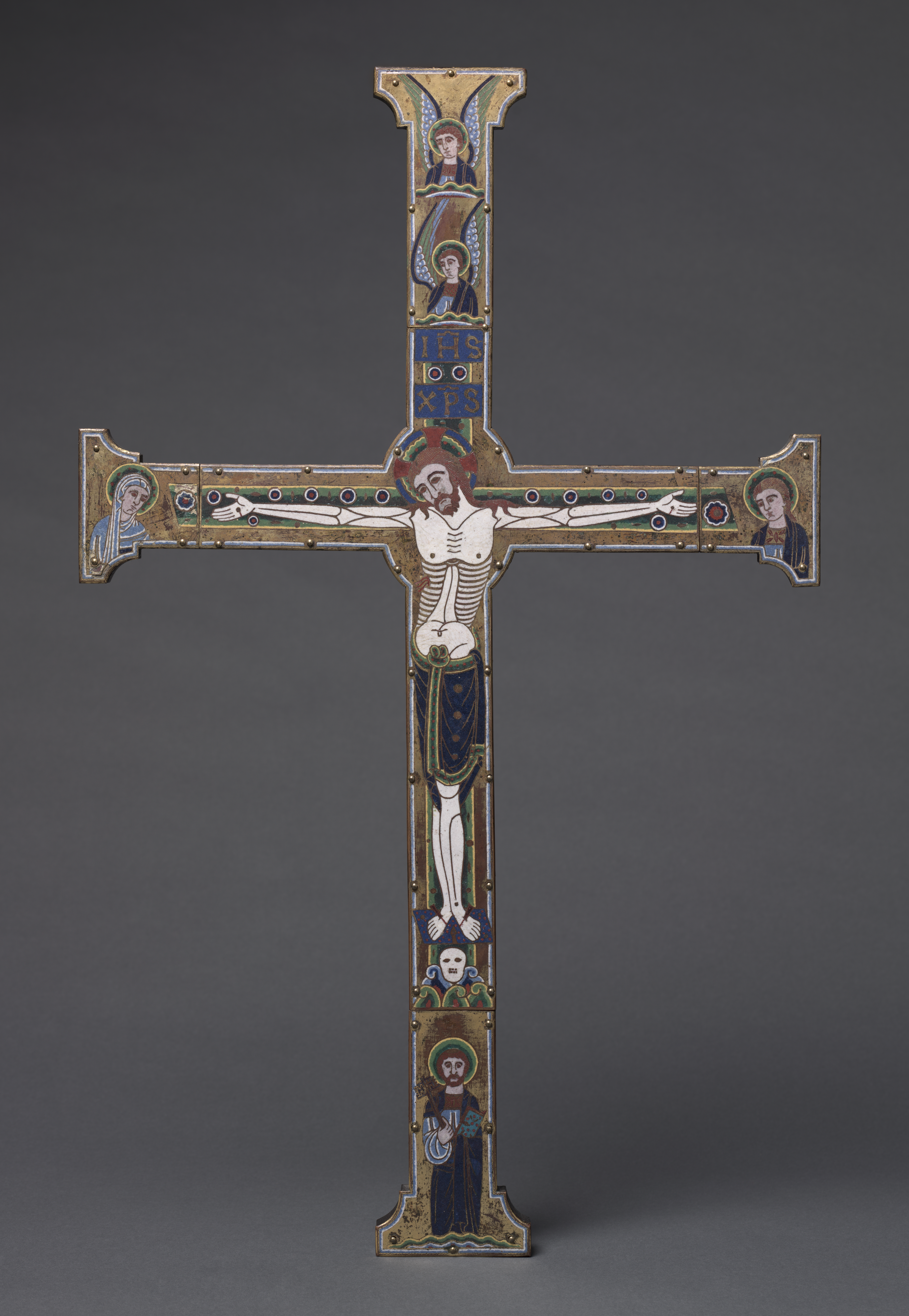
The Spitzer Cross, Cleveland Museum of Art

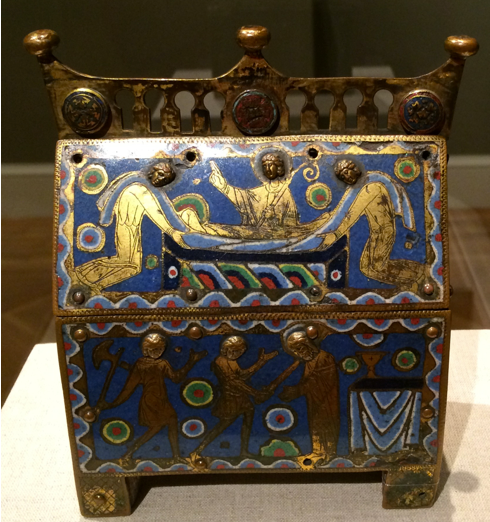
Becket chasse reliquary

== See also ==
- Saint Calminius Reliquary – 12th-century chasse reliquary
