= Pierre Courteys =

French painter

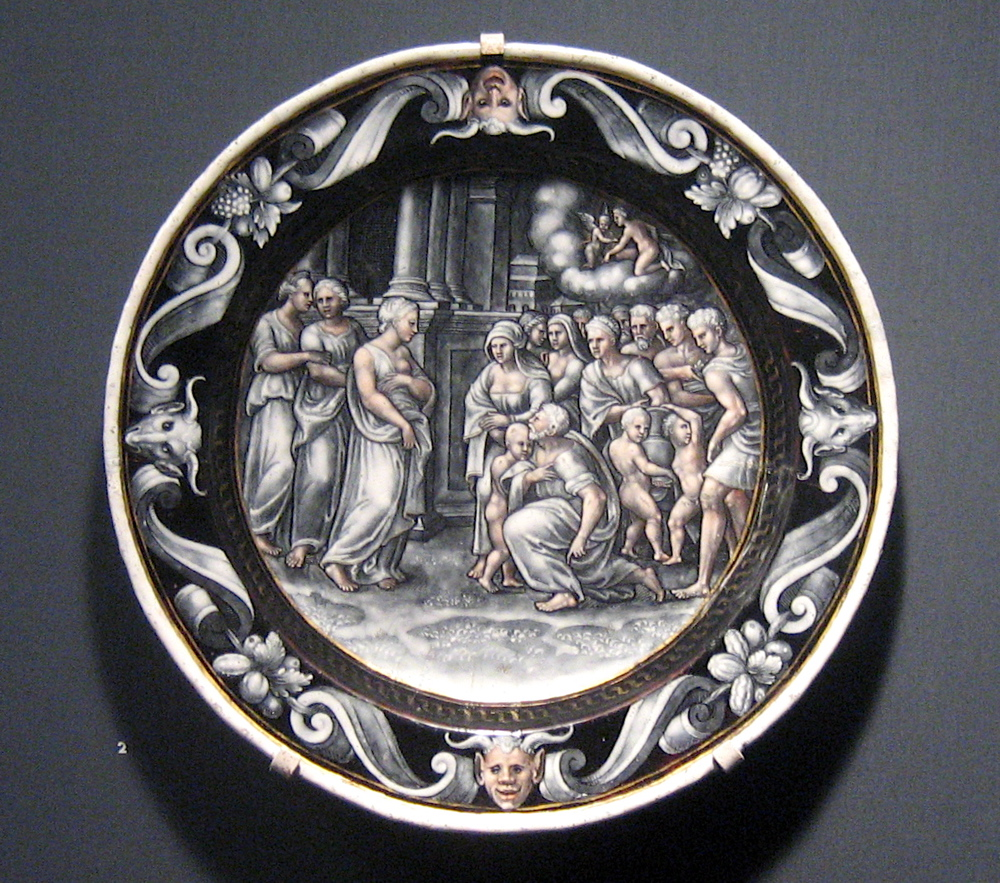
The Adoration of Psyche, 1560. Now at the Los Angeles County Museum of Art.

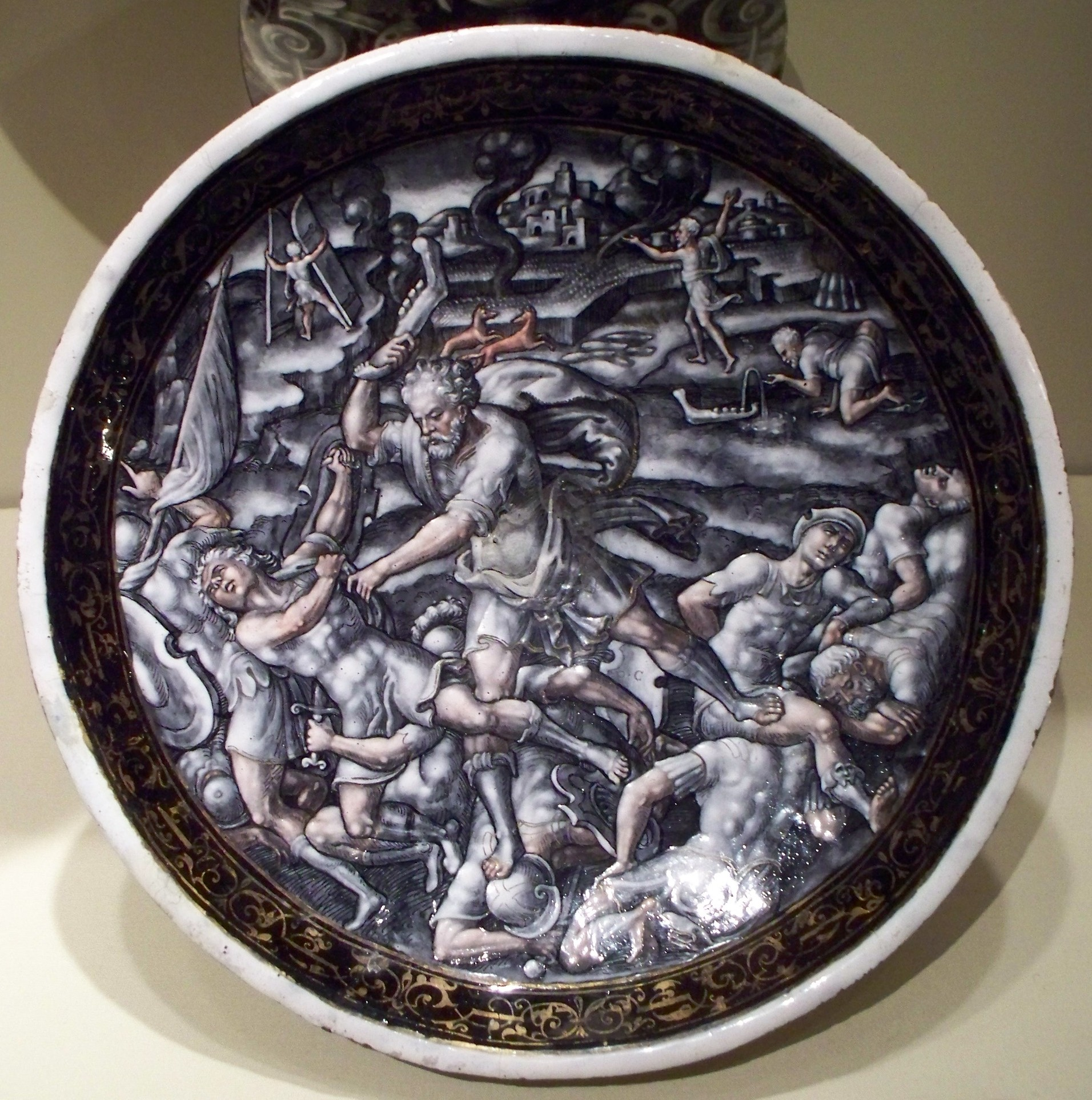
Standing Dish with Samson Crushing the Philistines with the Jawbone of an Ass, ca. 1580. Now at the Taft Museum of Art.

Pierre Courteys (d. 1602? ) was a French enamel painter, working in Limoges.

== Life ==
Courteys, one of the best enamel painters of Limoges, and an excellent designer and colourist, was probably a disciple of Pierre Reymond. The dates affixed to his works range from 1550 to 1568. In 1559 he executed twelve oval medallions with life-sized figures of the Virtues and the gods of Olympus, for the façade of the château of Madrid, built by Francis I and Henry II in the Bois de Boulogne in Paris. Nine of these are now in the Hôtel de Cluny, and three are in England. They are the largest enamels which have ever been made at Limoges. Courteys is thought to have died in 1602. Many of his works are in the Louvre.
