= Suzanne de Court =

French artist

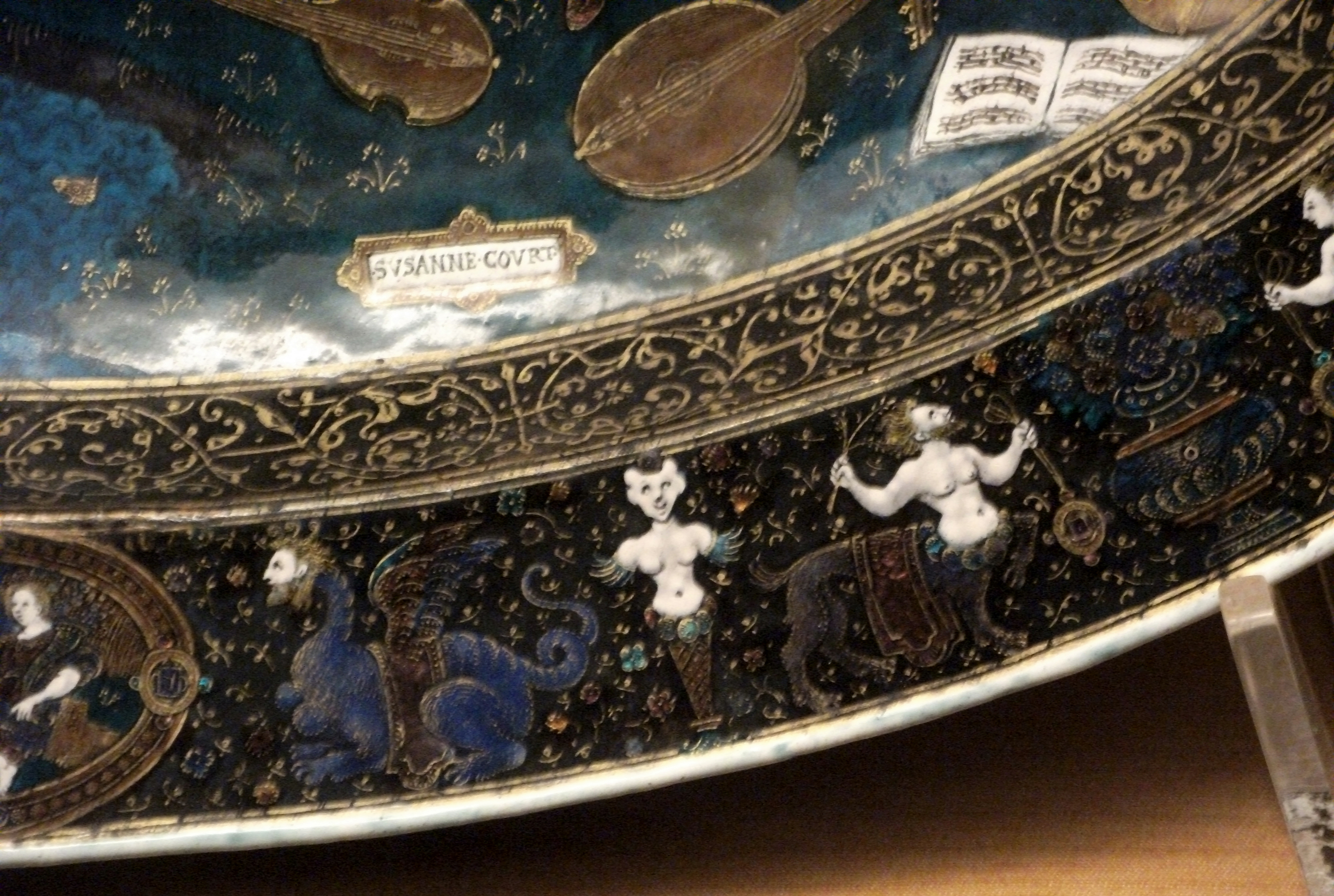
Signature on a platter in the Waddesdon Bequest, British Museum

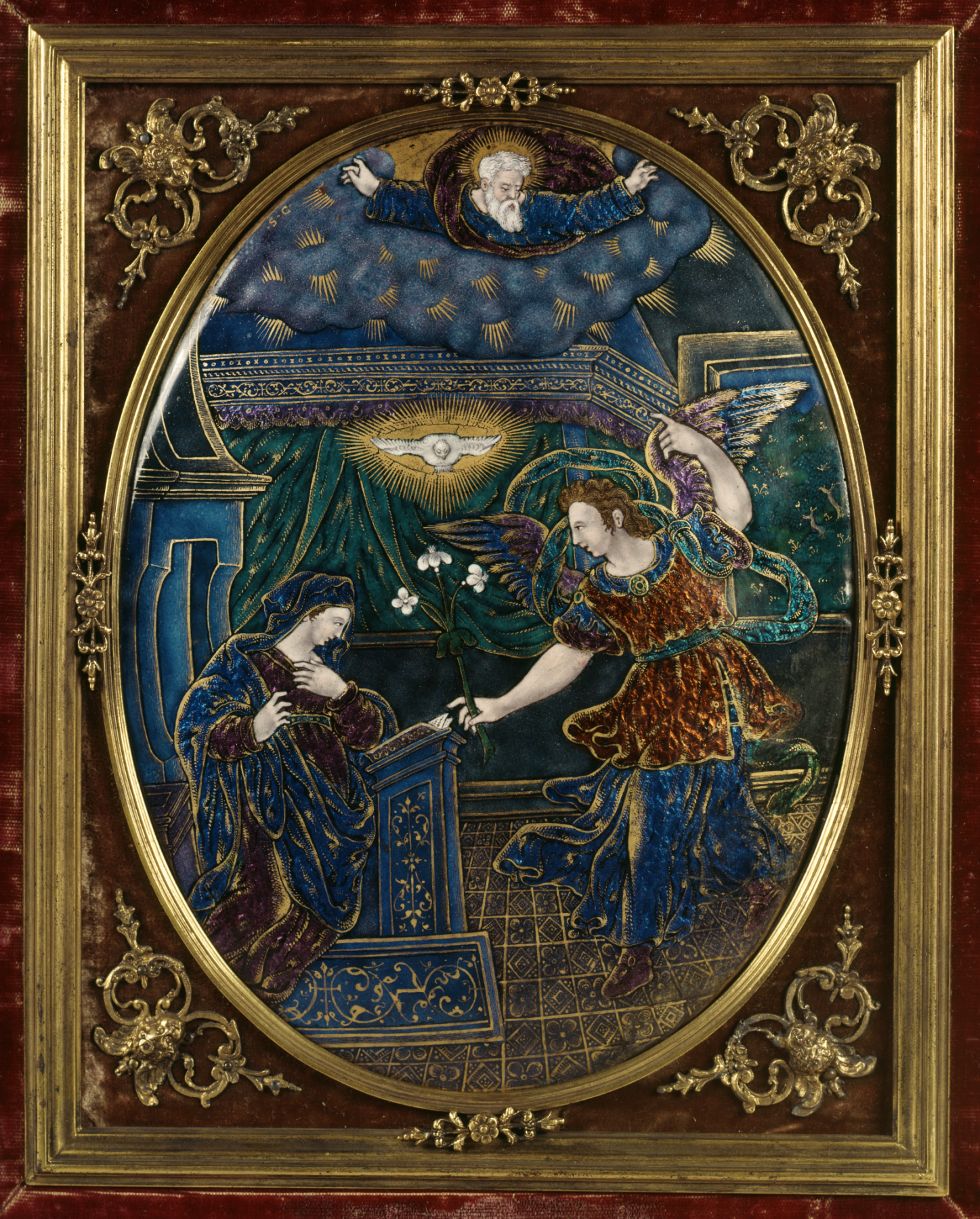
Oval Plaque with the Annunciation, Walters Art Museum

Suzanne de Court (fl. 1600) was a French enamel painter in the Limoges workshops, probably running a workshop of some size producing pieces of the highest quality. She was the only identifiable woman signing Limoges pieces, though this may be in her capacity as owner of the workshop; only one other female enamel painter is recorded in the period. None of her work is dated but she is thought to have been active between (at the widest) 1575 and 1625, especially around 1600, and was very possibly the daughter of Jean de Court (fl. 1550–1600), from a dynasty of Limoges painters.

The de Court dynasty of enamel painters ran a workshop making Limoges enamel over several generations in Limoges in south-western France. They, or many of them, were Huguenots, which may explain why there is no record of her in church registers. The only document known to mention her disappeared in the 19th century. Suzanne was a common name among Huguenots. It is not clear if she was a de Court by birth or marriage. Often pieces just bear "S.C.", but sometimes her full name, as illustrated. Her forms of signature include: "SUSANNE COURT, SUSANNE DE COURT, SC or SDC", usually on the front of pieces. According to the British Museum, she was "renowned for work with translucent enamels over foil, and draughtsmanship; specialising in secular, usually mythological scenes".

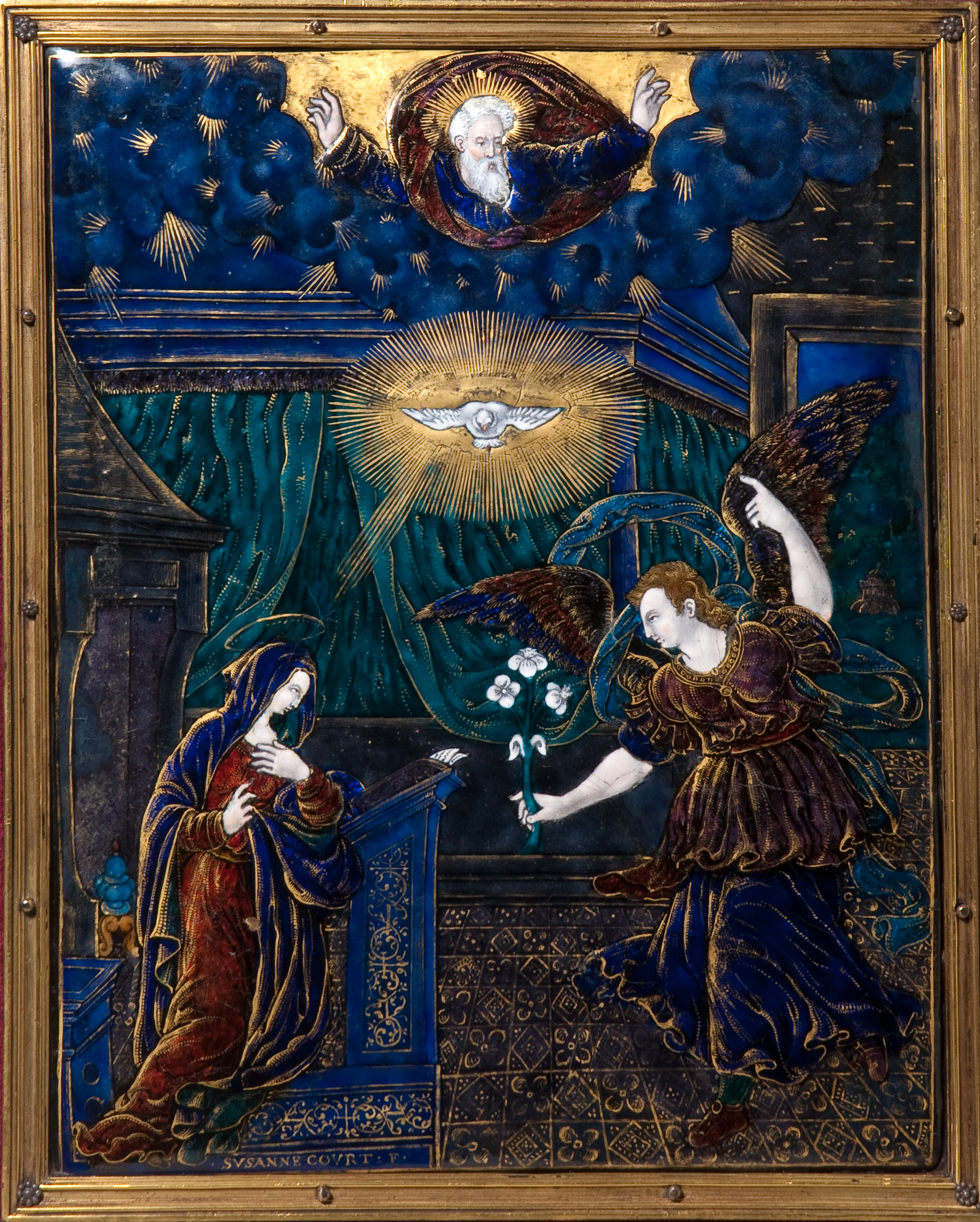
Suzanne de Court, Plaque depicting The Annunciation, c. 1600 at Waddesdon Manor

The scenes she painted were often copied from Italian prints, where religious series were widespread in both print and in enamel. This meant the proliferation of religious scenes across Europe intensified and became a prominent part of popular culture, demonstrated on contemporary plaques. As enamellers made the plaques smaller, a response to the decline in royal and noble patronage in the 17th century, historians such as Michaela Daborn (2015) question how du Court's scenes would have been displayed.

It is unclear how such plaques would have been displayed. Inventories indicate they could be hung in frames that held several plaques of varying subject matter, or they were stored in cabinets or desks (Beyssi- Cassan, 2006, pp. 251-252).

Work by Susanne de Court is characterized by varying tones of blues and greens with white flesh tints, and by a delicate painterly technique. Her work is in several French museums, and most other major collections of Limoges painted enamels such as the British Museum, Waddesdon Manor, the Frick Collection, the Princeton University Art Museum, the Metropolitan Museum of Art, New York, and the Walters Art Museum, Baltimore.
