= Peristerium =

Metallic dove-shaped vessels in churches

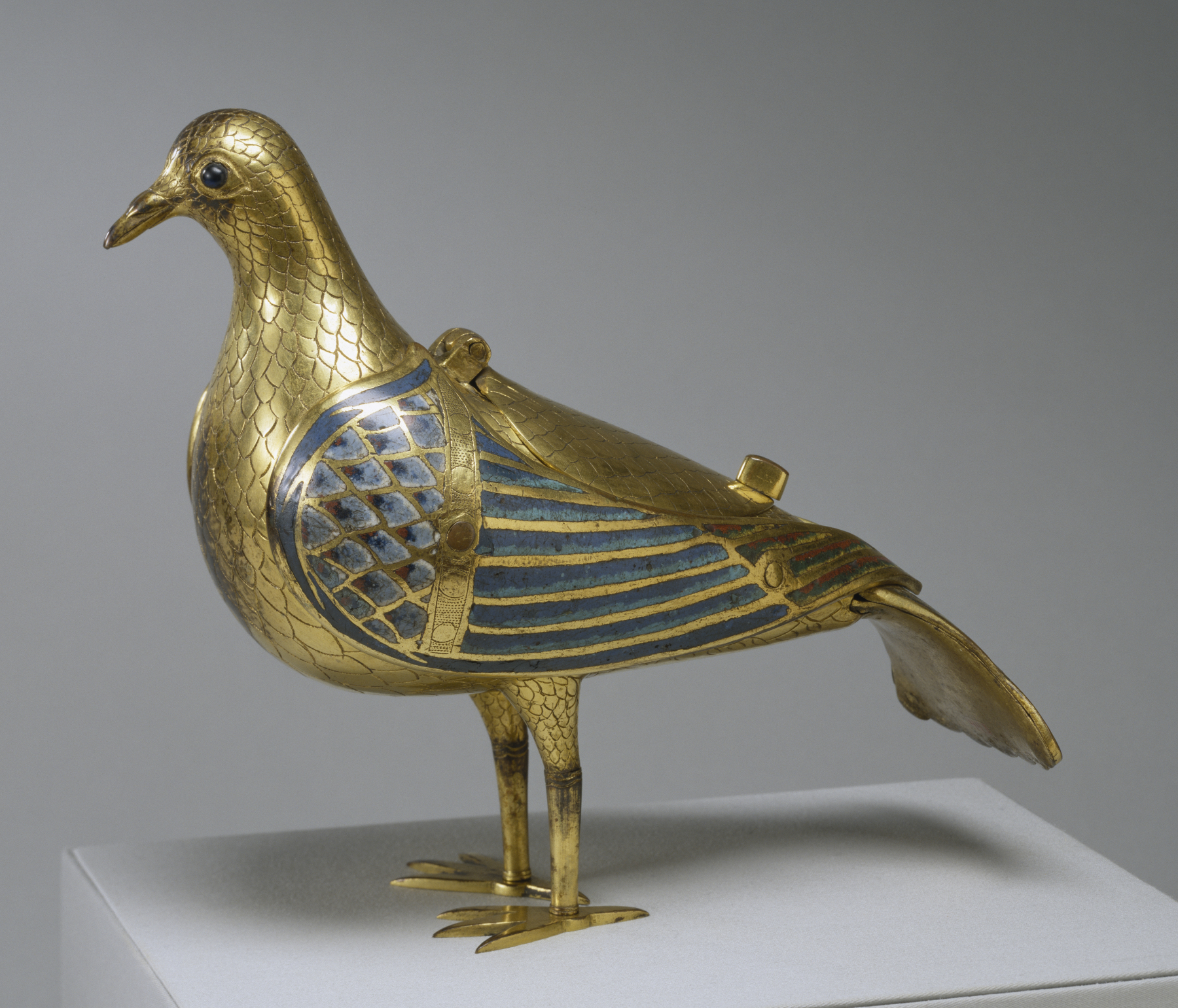
Limoges enamel dove, Walters Art Museum

A peristerium, or Eucharistic dove in the Western church, is a metallic vessel, in the shape of a dove (pigeon), which can be hung over an altar, most often in Eastern Christian churches.

== Purpose ==
Western eucharistic doves were used in medieval churches to keep consecrated hosts from the Eucharist (the Blessed Sacrament). These consecrated Hosts are in the Pyx, which could be put into it by a flap in the back of the dove's body. Many were made in Spanish or Limoges enamel, with generally only the wings and eyes in enamel, the rest being gilded.

German theologian Matthias Joseph Scheeben wrote of the significance of using a peristerium to hold the Eucharist in The Mysteries of Christianity: "How striking and well devised was the ancient usage of reserving the Eucharist in a receptacle symbolic of the Holy Spirit in a vessel fashioned in the form of a dove — in the so-called peristerium! How beautifully the Holy Spirit was thus symbolized as He who brings and fashions the gift contained in that receptacle; as He who, encompassing and permeating that gift as fire does the coal, dwells therein with His essence and His power!"

== Icon ==
The dove is a widely used symbol of the Christian Church. It symbolizes the Holy Spirit, is an attribute of the Virgin Mary, and was later one of the apostles. As a symbol of resurrection, pigeons were placed in the tombs of the martyrs. Also grave lamps in the form of doves were common.

== Literature ==
- Bonaparte: Iconography of the pigeons, Paris, 1857.
