= Léonard Limosin =

French painter (c. 1505–c. 1577)

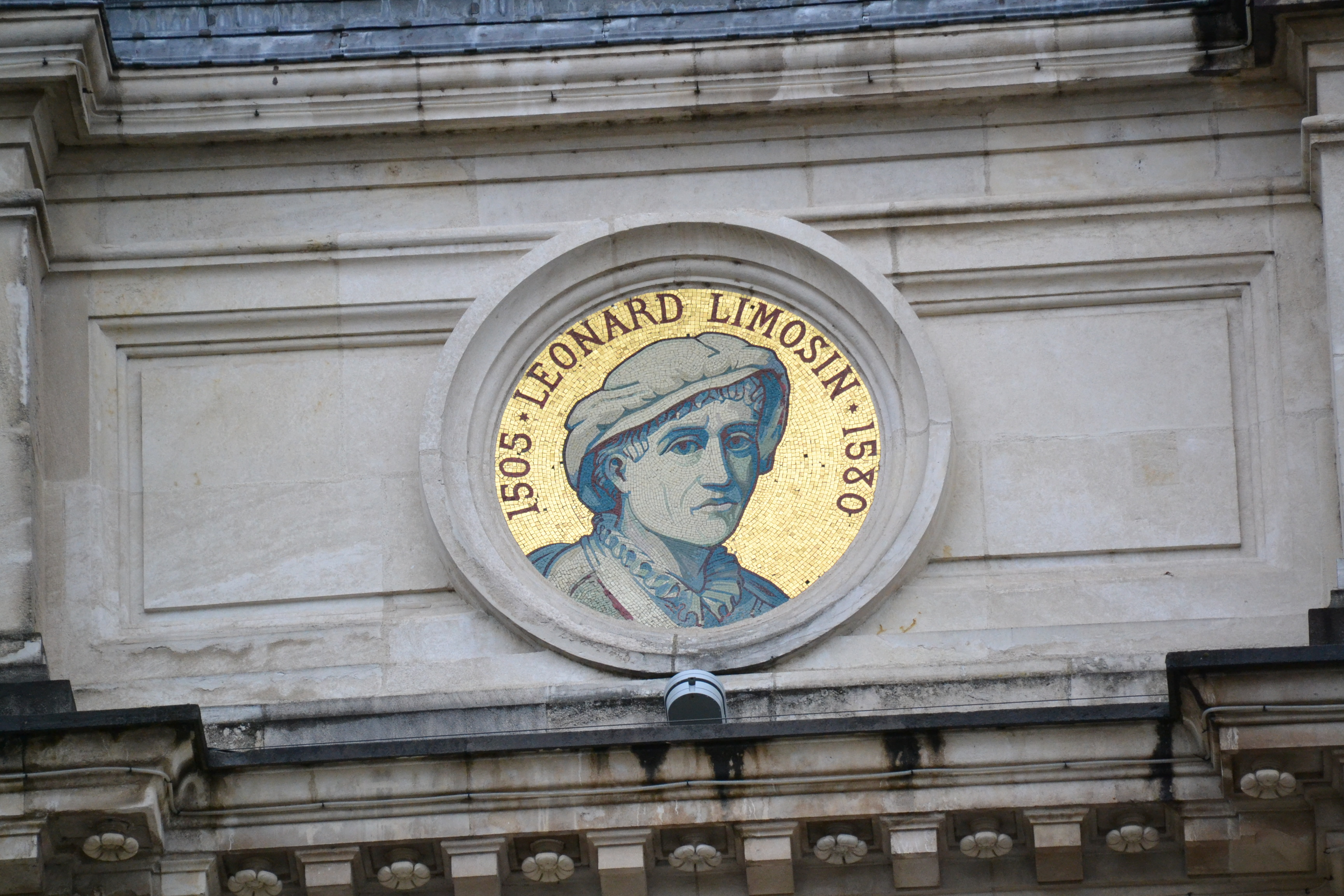
- Mosaic by Giandomenico Facchina, Limoges town hall
- Born: c. 1505; Limoges
- Died: 1570s Limoges
- Occupations: Painter, stained-glass artist, engraver, glass painter, enameler, artist

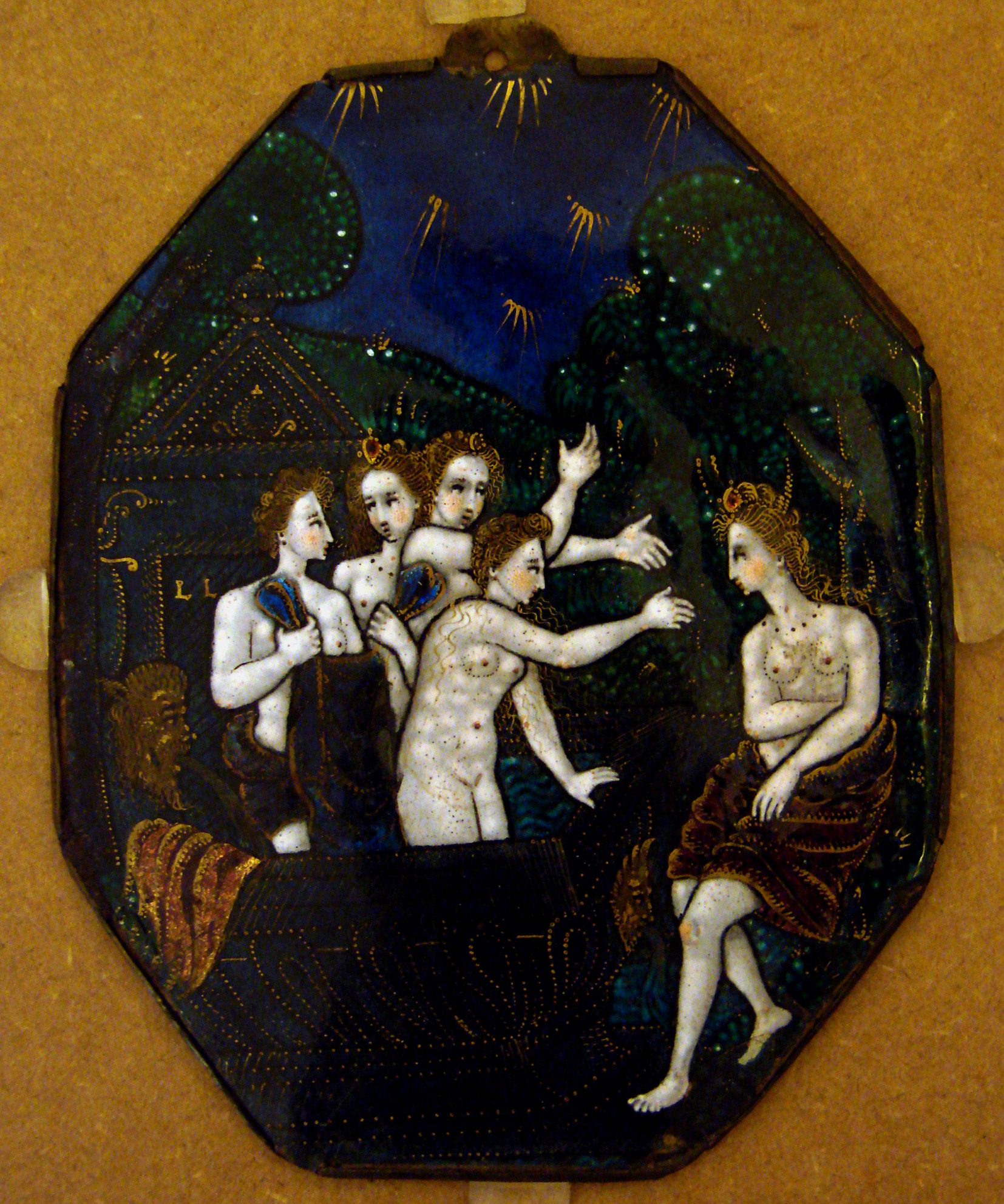
Bathers, in the municipal museum of Châlons-en-Champagne

Leonard Limousin (or Limosin) (c. 1505 – c. 1577) was a French painter, the most famous of a family of seven Limoges enamel painters, the son of a Limoges innkeeper.

He is supposed to have studied under Nardon Pénicaud. He was certainly at the beginning of his career influenced by the German school. Indeed, his earliest authenticated work, signed L. L. and dated 1532, is a series of eighteen plaques of the Passion of the Lord, after Albrecht Dürer, but this influence was counterbalanced by that of the Italian masters of the school of Fontainebleau, Primaticcio, Rosso, Giulio Romano and Andrea Solari, from whom he acquired his taste for arabesque ornament and for mythological subjects. Nevertheless, the French tradition was sufficiently ingrained in him to save him from becoming an imitator and from losing his personal style.

In 1530 he entered the service of Francis I as painter and varlet de chambre, a position which he retained under Henry II. For both these monarchs he executed many portraits in enamel—among them quite a number of plaques depicting Diane de Poitiers in various characters, plates, vases, ewers, and cups, besides decorative works for the royal palaces, for, though he is best known as an enameller distinguished for rich color, and for graceful designs in grisaille on black or bright blue backgrounds, he also enjoyed a great reputation as an oil-painter.

His last signed works bear the date 1574, but the date of his death is uncertain, though it could not have been later than the beginning of 1577. It is on record that he executed close upon two thousand enamels. He is best represented at the Louvre, which owns his two famous votive tablets for the Sainte Chapelle, each consisting of twenty-three plaques, signed L. L. and dated 1553; La Chasse, depicting Henry II on a white horse, Diane de Poitiers behind him on horseback; and many portraits, including the kings by whom he was employed, Marguerite de Valois, the duc de Guise, and the cardinal de Lorraine. Other representative examples are at the Cluny and Limoges museums. In England some magnificent examples of his work are to be found at the Victoria and Albert Museum, the British Museum, and the Wallace Collection. In the collection of Signor Rocchi, in Rome, is an exceptionally interesting plaque representing Frances I consulting a fortuneteller.
