= Jean de Court =

French painter

Jean de Court used painted Limoges enamel and oil painting, and served as official portrait painter to the monarchs of Scotland and France. The de Court dynasty of enamel painters ran a workshop making Limoges enamel over several generations in Limoges in south-western France.

In 1567, he is recorded as a valet and court painter of Mary Queen of Scots, although it is not clear if he had actually accompanied her to Scotland. In 1572, he succeeded François Clouet as painter to the king at the court of her brother-in-law Charles IX of France, and was in turn succeeded by his son, Charles de Court, in 1584 or 1589. Jean de Court painted in 1574 a portrait of Henry III, then Duke of Anjou. He painted a miniature portrait of him as king four years later.

Noted enamel painter Susanne (de) Court is speculated to have been the daughter of Jean.

== Gallery ==
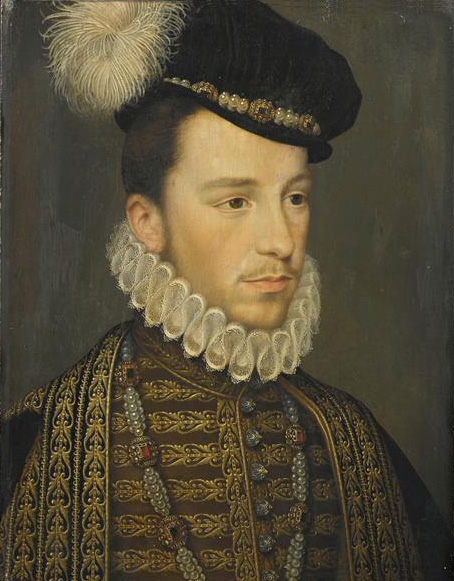
Henry III of France, now at the Musée Condé in the Château de Chantilly

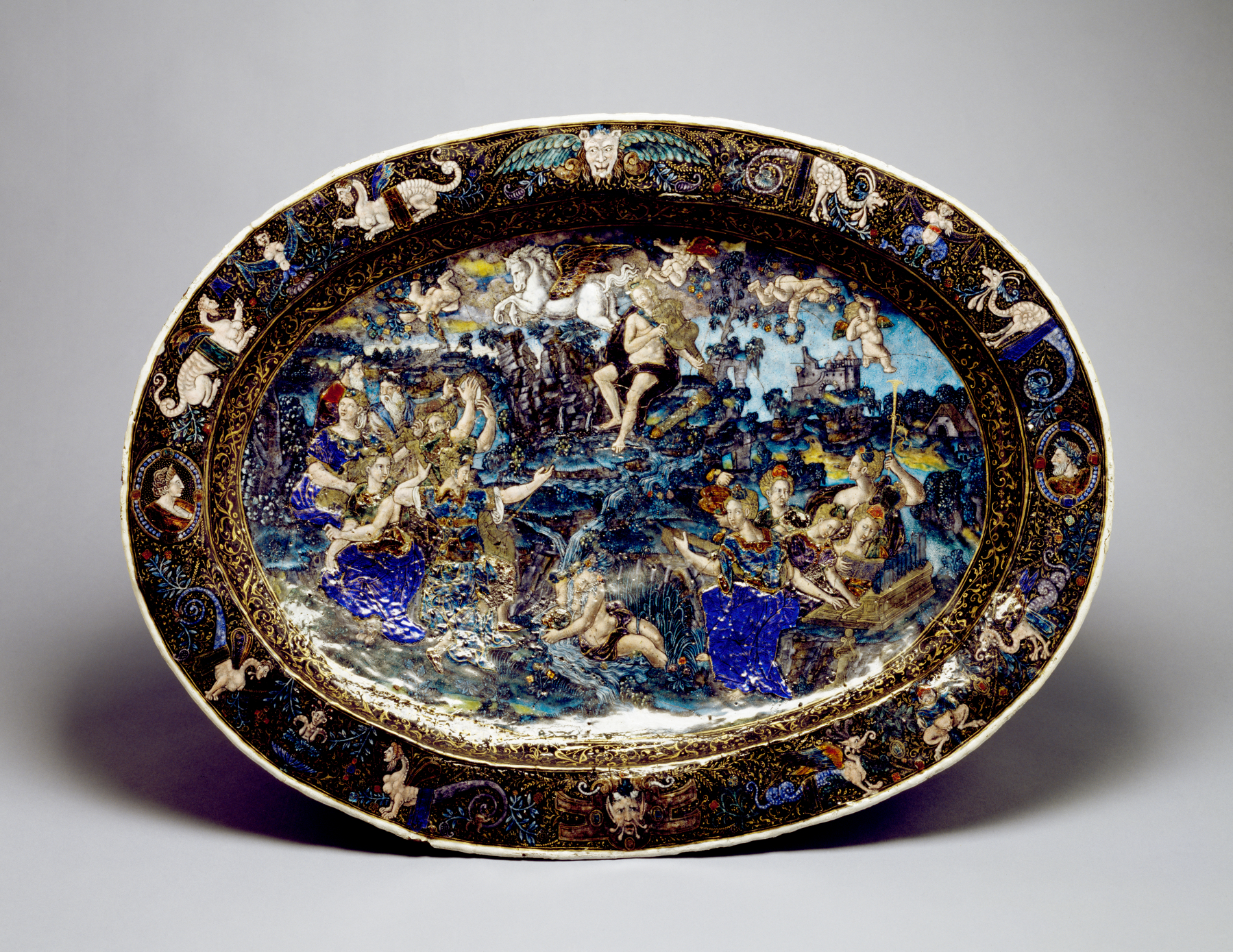
Enamel painting: Apollo and the Muses by Jean de Court

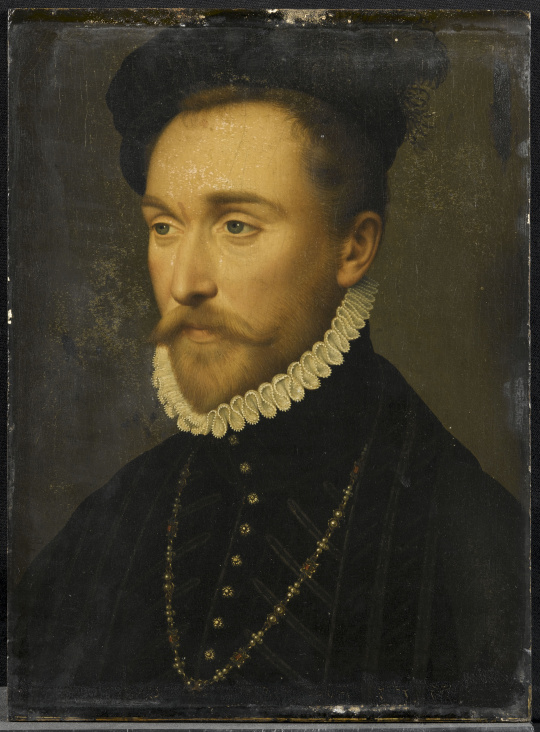
Albert de Gondi, now at the Musée Condé

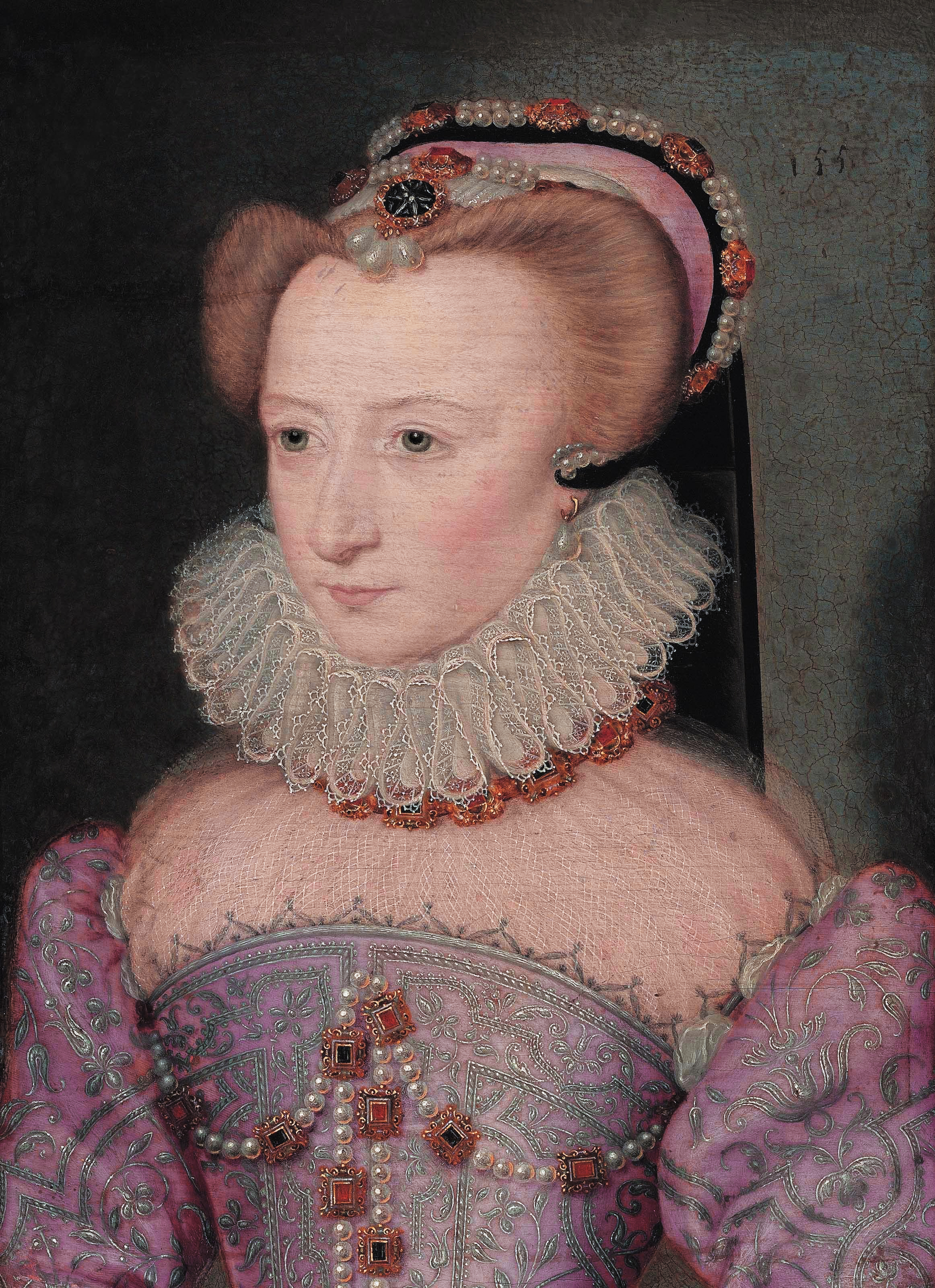
Portrait of a lady, traditionally identified as Louise de Lorraine (1553-1601)
