= Pierre Reymond =

French enameller

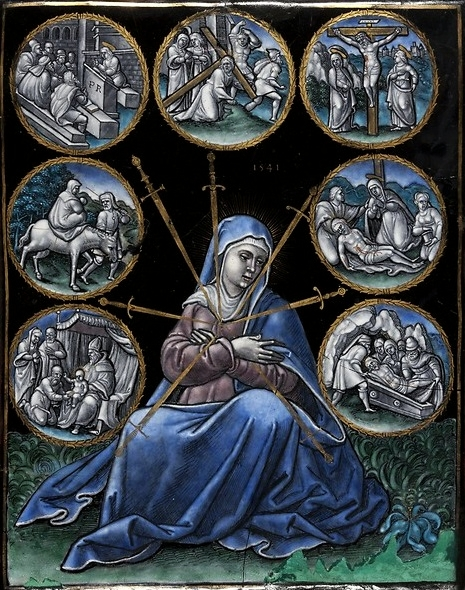
Plaque with Seven Sorrows of Mary by Pierre Reymond, National Museum in Warsaw, 1541

Pierre Reymond (1513–1584) was a French enamelist.

Reymond managed a large workshop in Limoges, where one of his disciples was Pierre Courteys. As was the practice of the time, pieces produced in his workshop bore his initials even though they were not necessarily his work. He specialized in tableware decorated with mythological scenes including cups, plates, bowls, and dishes.

Reymond also made the enamelled altarpiece commissioned by Anne de Montmorency for the chapel of his Château d'Écouen.

The Petit Palais in Paris, France has a display of one of Reymond's work.
