= Petit Trianon =

Small château in the grounds of the Palace of Versailles

Coordinates: 48°48′56″N 2°06′35″E

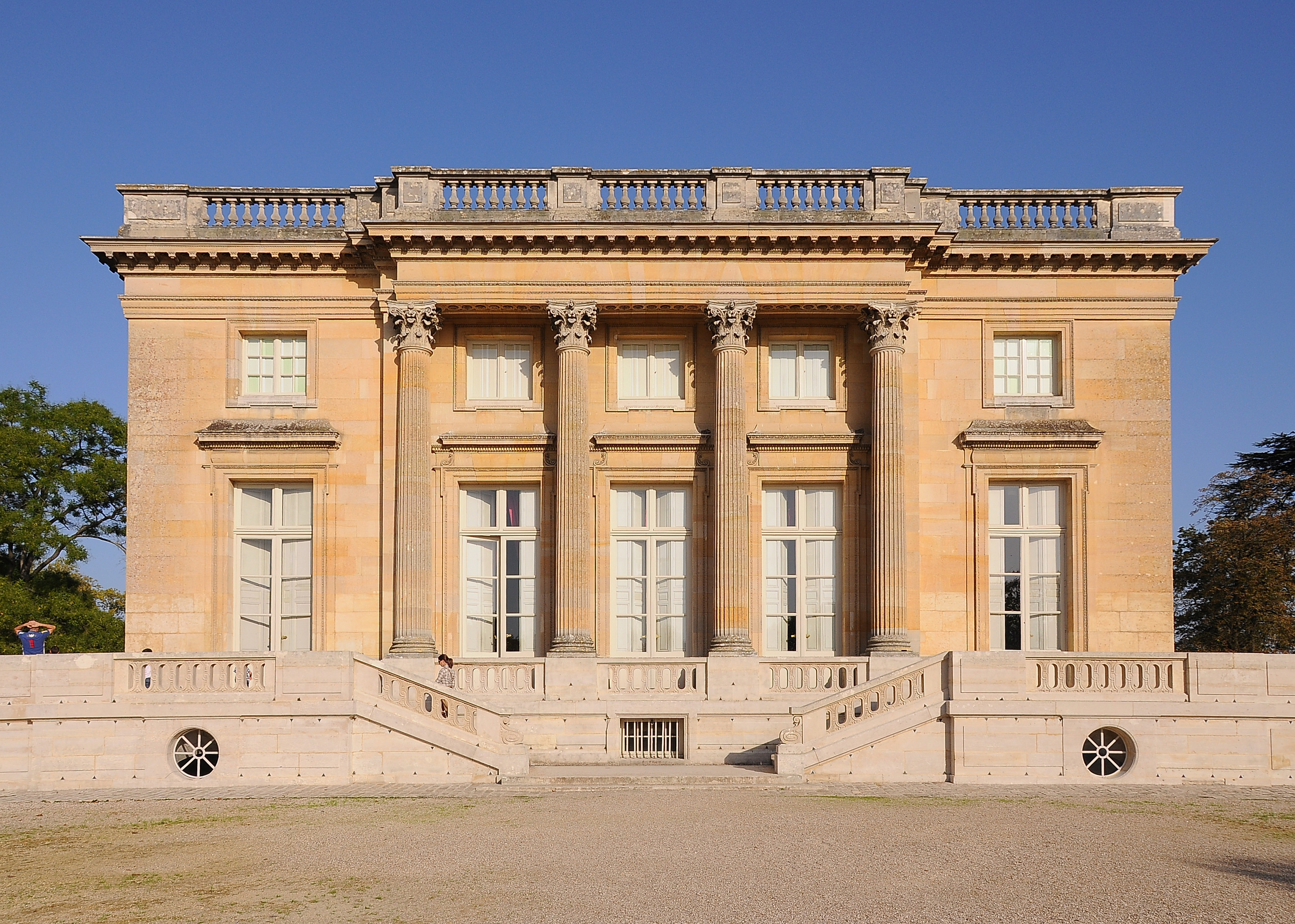
- West façade of the Petit Trianon
- Interactive map of the Petit Trianon area

General information
- Type: Château
- Architectural style: French Neoclassical (more precisely Louis XV and Louis XVI)
- Location: Versailles, France
- Construction started: 1762
- Completed: 1768
- Client: Louis XV

Technical details
- Material: Limestone
- Floor count: 3

Design and construction
- Architect: Ange-Jacques Gabriel
- Known for: Retreat of Marie Antoinette

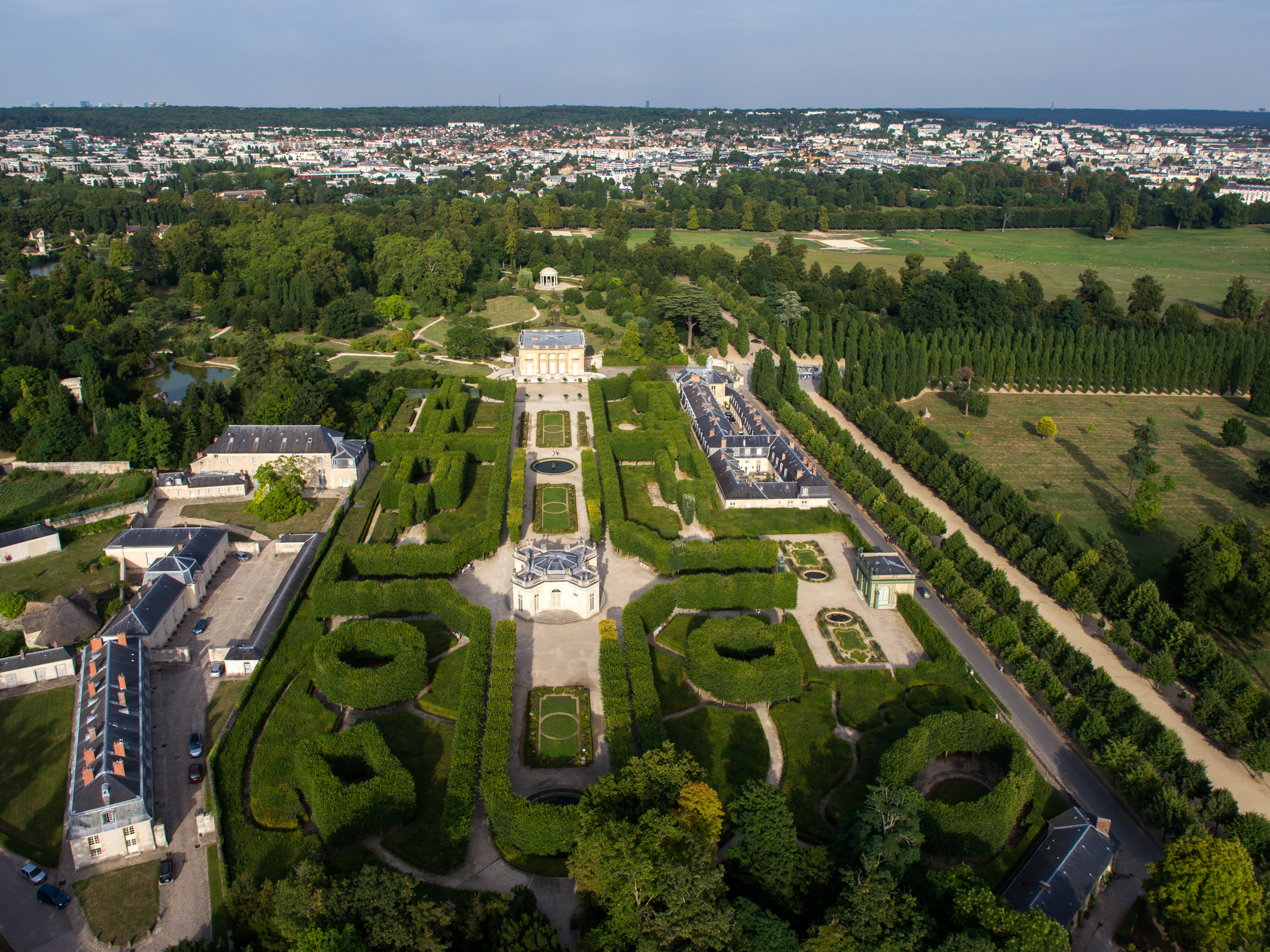
Aerial view of the gardens of the Petit Trianon. The Petit Trianon is in the centre, the Temple de l'Amour is behind, the Pavillon français in front, all in the same perspective

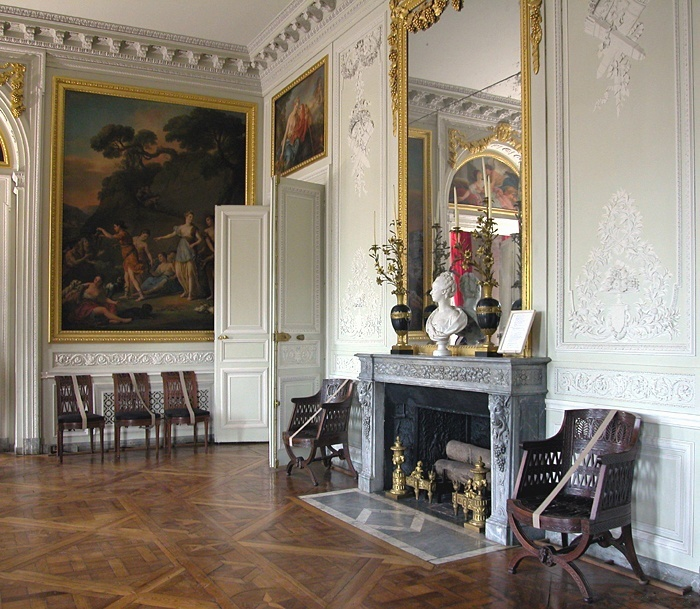
The salle à manger (dining room): finely carved boiseries are without gilding, simply painted to complement the bleu Turquin chimneypiece

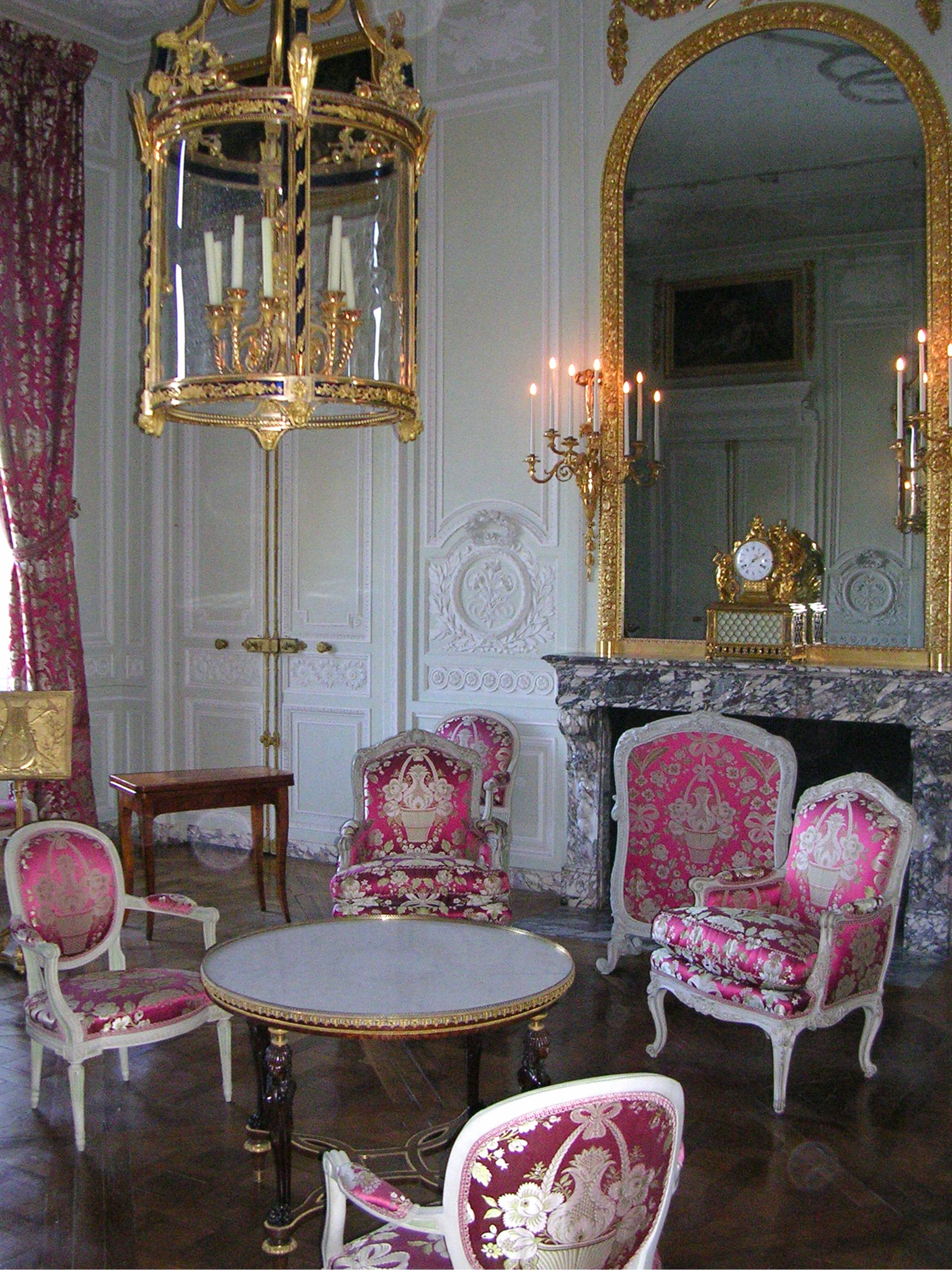
The salon de compagnie

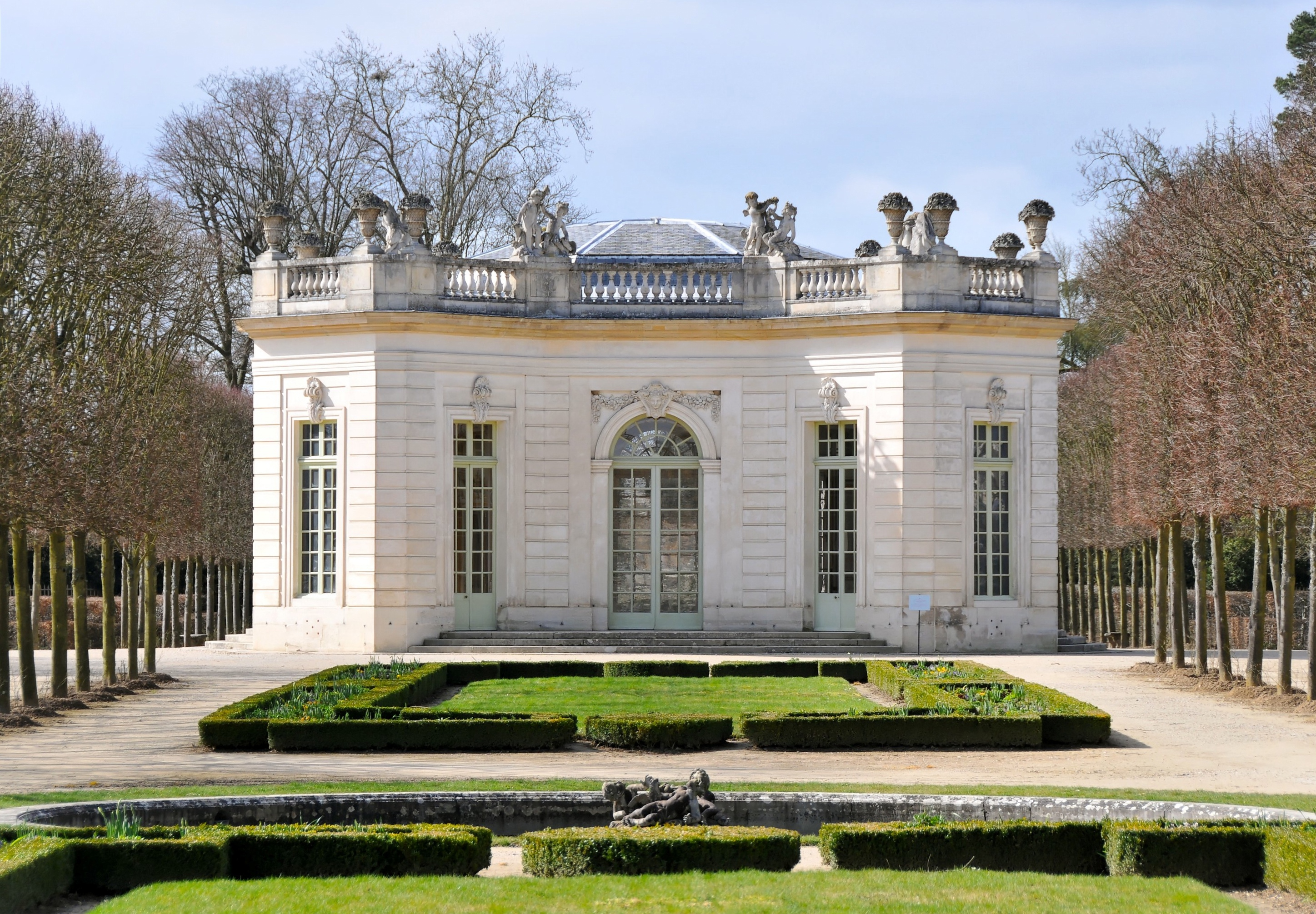
The Pavillon français

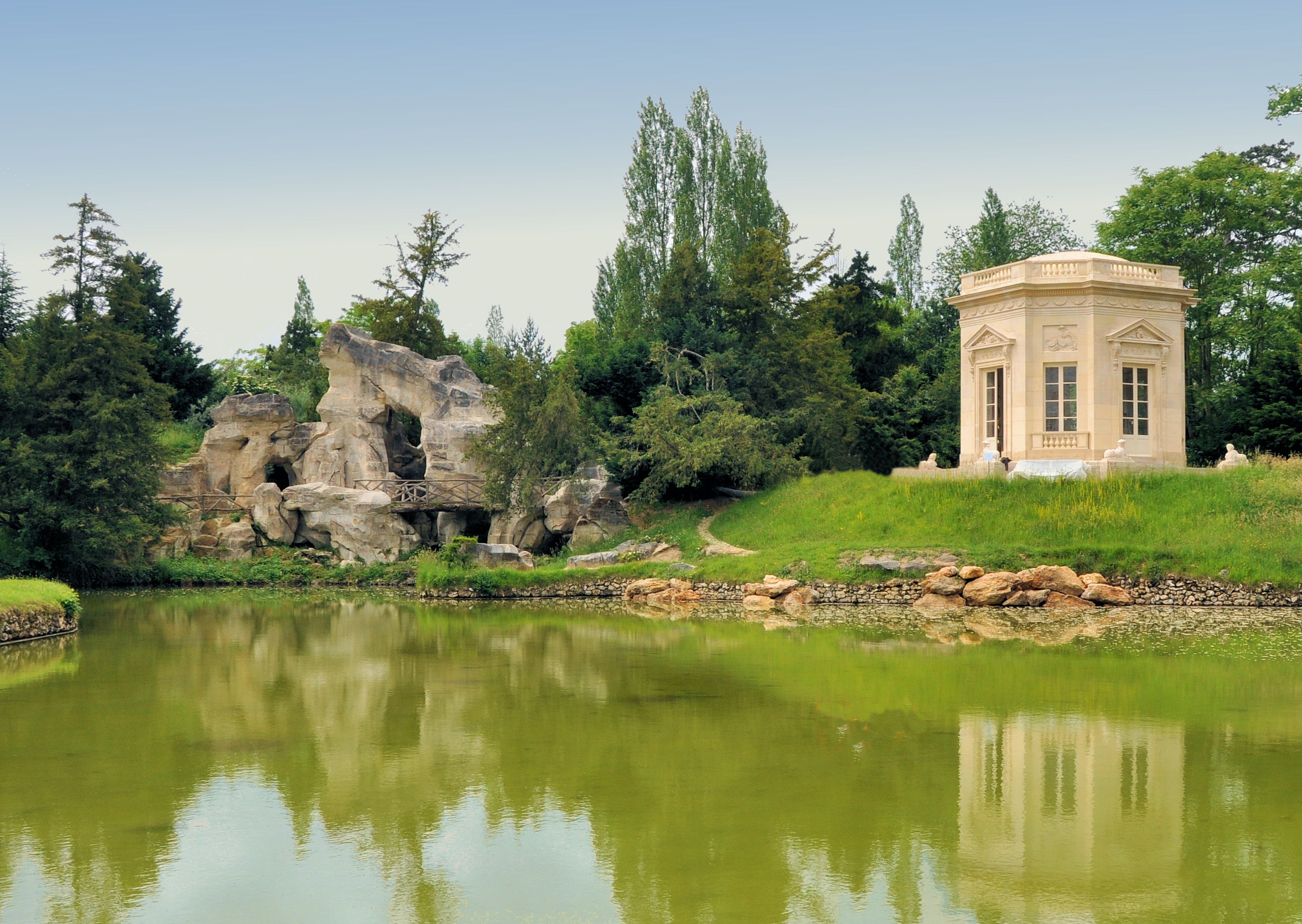
The Rock and Belvédère in the English garden

The Petit Trianon (French pronunciation: [pəti tʁijanɔ̃]; French for 'small Trianon') is a Neoclassical style château located on the grounds of the Palace of Versailles in Versailles, France. It was built between 1762 and 1768 during the reign of King Louis XV. The Petit Trianon was constructed within the gardens of a larger royal retreat known as the Grand Trianon.

== Design and construction ==
The Petit Trianon was built on the site of a botanical garden developed about a decade earlier by Louis XV, within the grounds of the Grand Trianon, Louis XIV's retreat. It was designed by Ange-Jacques Gabriel by order of Louis XV for his mistress, Madame de Pompadour, and was constructed between 1762 and 1768. Madame de Pompadour died four years before its completion, and the Petit Trianon was subsequently occupied by her successor, Madame du Barry. Upon his accession to the throne in 1774, the 20-year-old Louis XVI gave the château and its surrounding park to his 19-year-old wife, Marie Antoinette, for her exclusive use.

The Petit Trianon is an example of the transition from the Rococo style of the earlier part of the 18th century to the Neoclassical style of the 1760s and onward. It attracts interest in its four façades, each designed according to that part of the estate it would face. The Corinthian order predominates, with two freestanding and two engaged columns on the side of the formal French garden, and pilasters facing both the courtyard and the area once occupied by Louis XV's greenhouses. Overlooking the former botanical garden of the King, the remaining façade was left bare.

Marie Antoinette would visit the Petit Trianon to escape the formality of court life and to rest from her royal responsibilities. Since it was her private property, no one was permitted to enter the property without the Queen's permission. Only the Queen's inner circle (including the princesse de Lamballe and the duchesse de Polignac) were invited, which alienated the court nobility. In the spring of 1779, Marie Antoinette retired to the Petit Trianon to recover from illness after the birth of her daughter Marie-Thérèse. Her entire household came with her, as well as four male friends to attend her: the duc de Coigny, the duc de Guînes, the comte d'Esterházy, and the baron de Besenval. This innocent activity was in violation of court etiquette and caused gossip to circulate. This was just one of the 'malicious insinuations against her which became so common later on.'

The building was designed to require as little interaction between guests and servants as possible. To that end, the table in the salle à manger (dining room) was conceived to be mobile, mechanically lowered and raised through the floorboards so that the servants below could set it while remaining unseen. These tables were never built as Louis XV found them too expensive, but the delineation for the mechanical apparatus can still be seen from the foundation.

In the attic, a suite was constructed for Louis XV by Ange-Jacques Gabriel, consisting of antechamber, bedroom, and a private chamber. A staircase led from his private chamber down to the mezzanine where Madame du Barry resided. In Marie Antoinette's time, the attic apartment remained reserved for her husband, Louis XVI. The private staircase of Louis XV was removed, allowing a library to be constructed by Richard Mique. The mezzanine, which is above the Queen's apartment, was reserved for Marie Antoinette's lady-in-waiting and first lady-in-waiting.

Within the Queen's apartment, the décor of her boudoir features mirrored panels that, by the turning of a crank, can be raised or lowered to obscure the windows and reflect the candlelight. Her bedroom was provided with furniture from Georges Jacob and Jean Henri Riesener. Jacob designed a set of furniture for the room known as the mobilier aux épis, elaborately carved with flowers, which Marie Antoinette was greatly fond of, and garlands. It was upholstered in embroidered Lyon silk. The wallpaper was painted by Jean-Baptiste Pillement.

Façades of the Petit Trianon

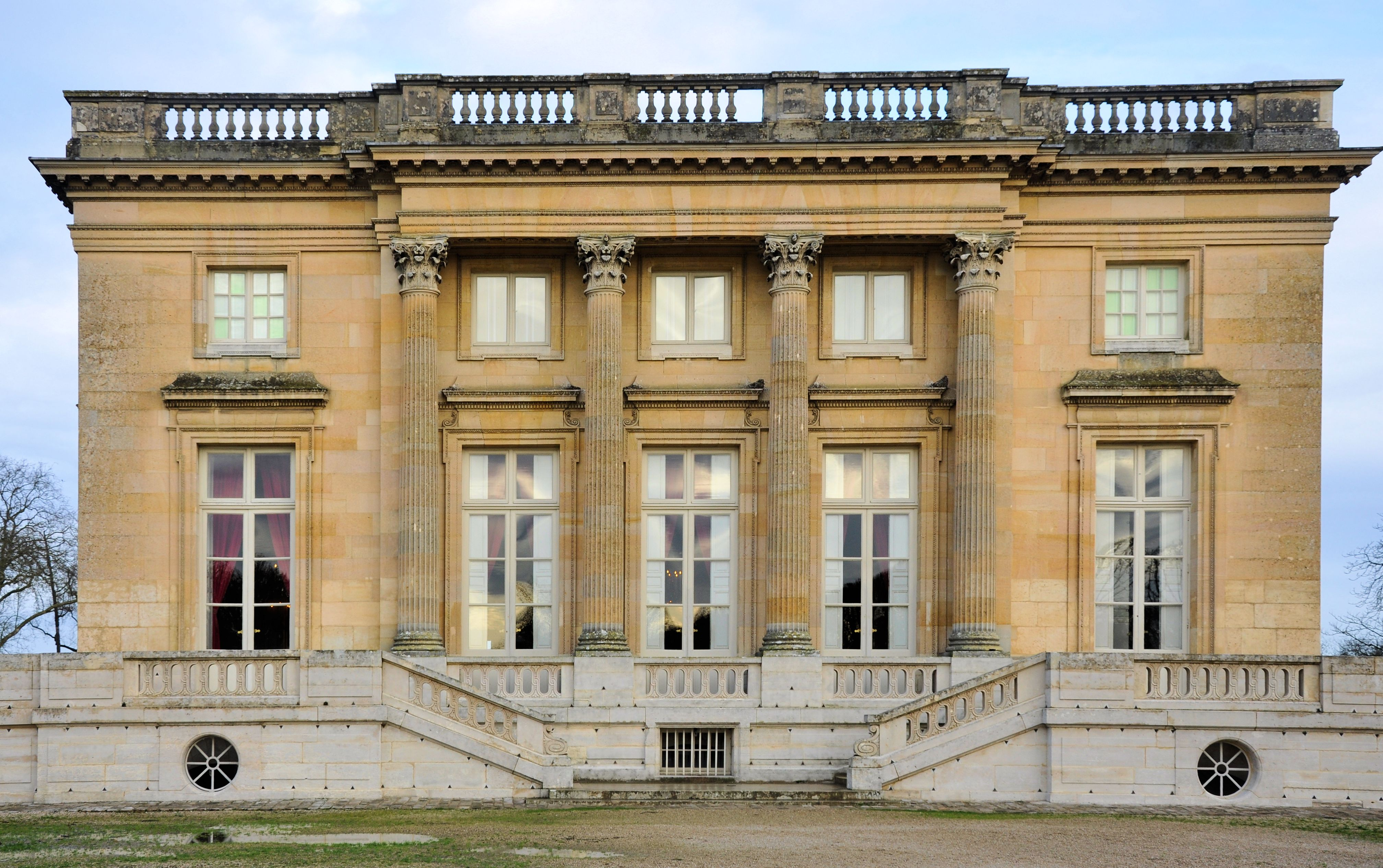
West façade

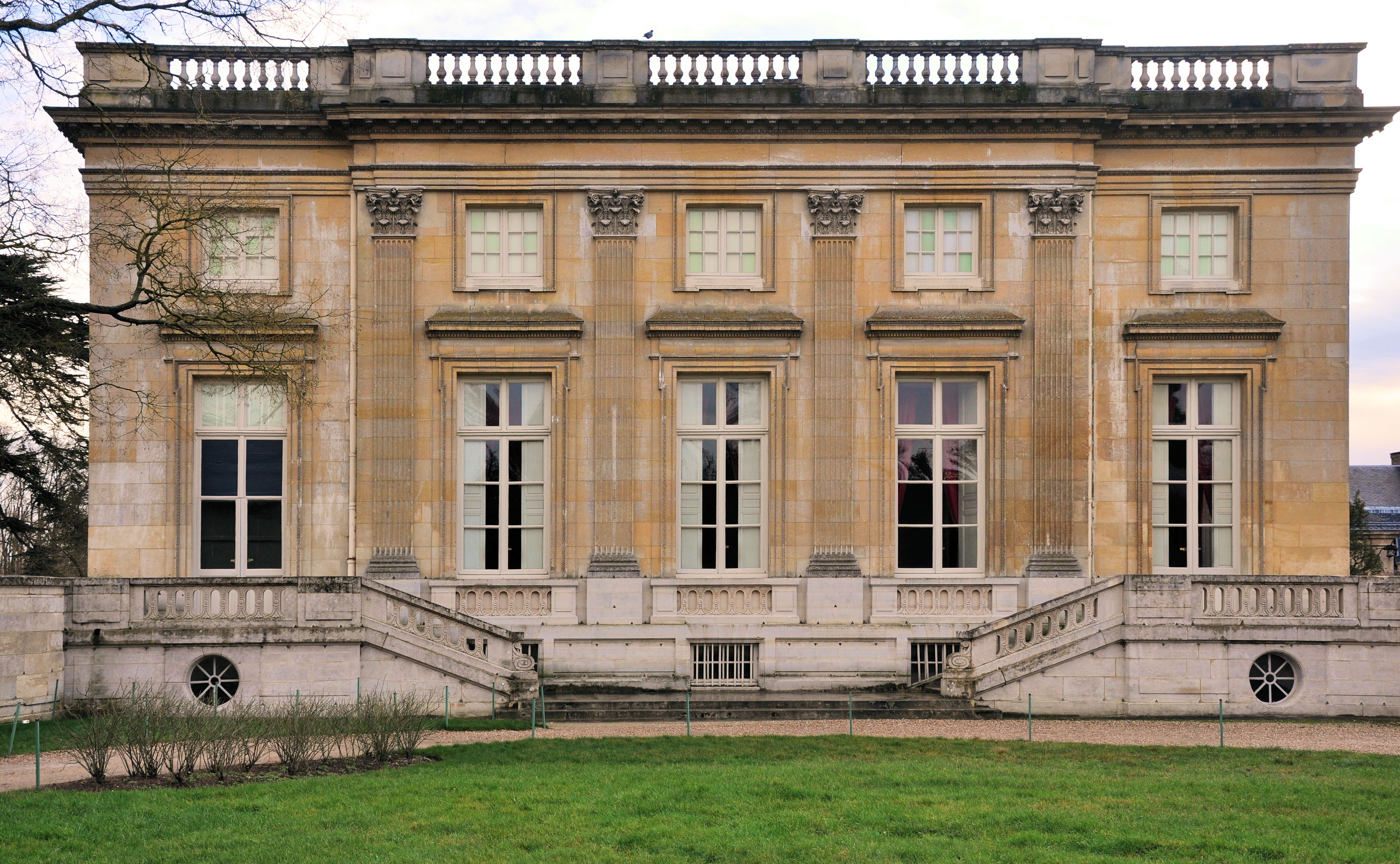
North façade

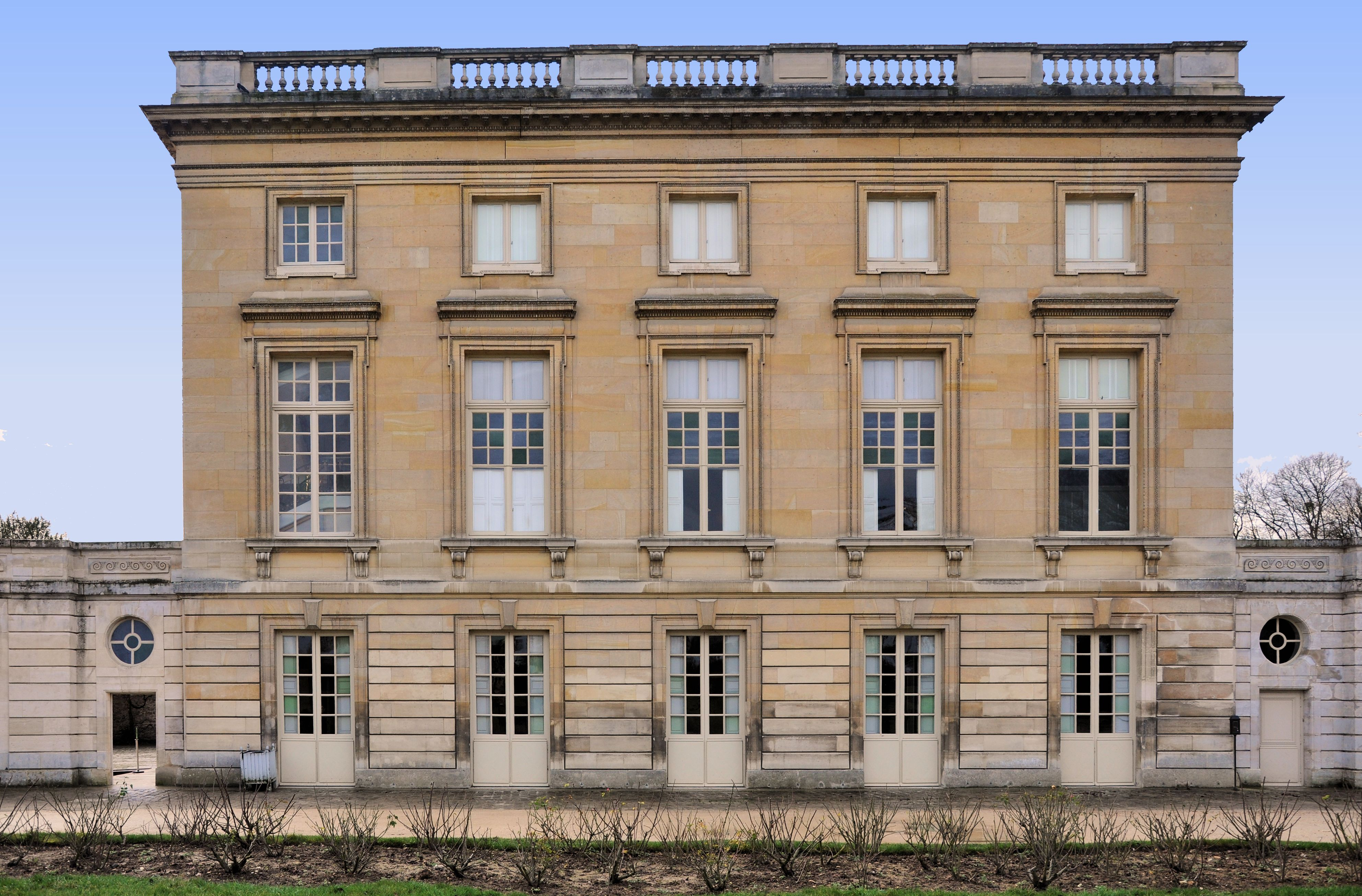
East façade

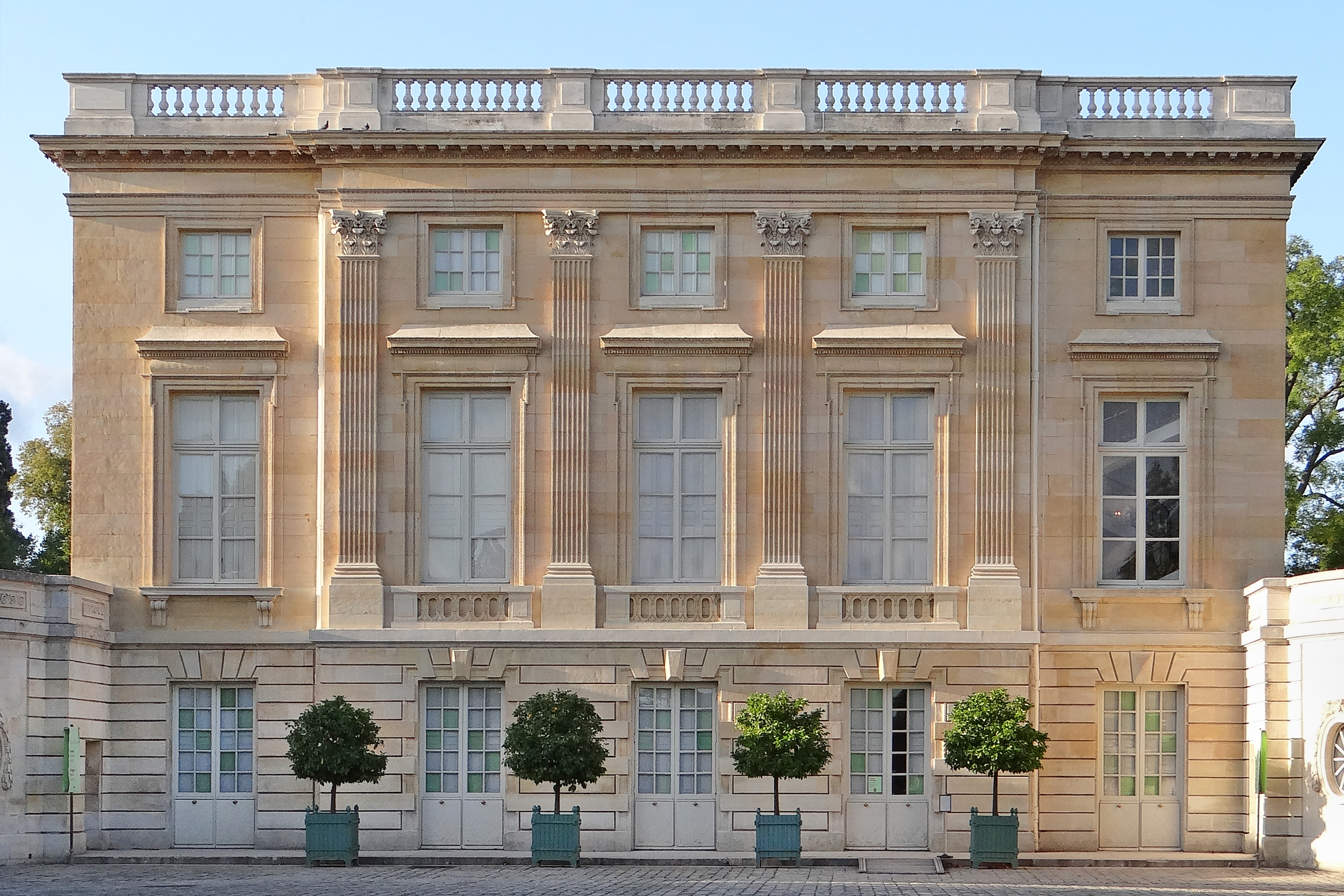
South façade

== French Revolution and Republic ==
On 5 October 1789, Marie Antoinette was sitting in the grotto, located in the gardens, alone, as most of her friends had left France following the storming of the Bastille. Suddenly, a page appeared, bringing news of the imminent arrival of an armed mob from Paris. With the forced departure of the royal family the next day, the Petit Trianon was almost abandoned, except for the gardeners and other staff who continued to live there. Renovations that had been underway were interrupted, leaving large sums owed to builders. The former Queen's gardener, Antoine Richard, was appointed as curator of the gardens and plant nursery in 1792 by the Minister of the Interior. After the overthrow of the monarchy in September 1792, all of the furniture, artworks, and other priceless objects of the Petit Trianon, carefully curated over the years, were removed, sold, and scattered under a decree of the National Convention dated 10 June 1793. The auction began on Sunday, 25 August 1793, and continued until 11 August 1794. Silverware, lead, and brass fixtures were requisitioned for use in the arsenals. The sculptor Amable Boichard was appointed in April 1794 to remove the 'emblems of royalty and feudalism' from the property.

Under the Republic, the Petit Trianon underwent a number of changes. Declared national property, the land was divided into ten lots, the gardens narrowly saved from being destroyed. The city of Versailles proposed that a botanical garden be established, but this plan was never adopted. In 1796, the land was leased to a tavern. By 1801, the use of the grounds for dances and festivals led to neglect and vandalism. The buildings of the hamlet were reported to be dilapidated. Some improvements in the layout of the gardens were subsequently made, and a school located in part of the complex.

== Empire ==
After years of neglect, Napoleon Bonaparte gave the building to his sister Pauline and later his second wife Marie Louise. Extensive refurbishing of roofs, piping, floors, and chimneys was carried out. The main rooms were repainted, and mirrors were installed to replace those sold or vandalised. Finally, paintings were hung and a bridge de la Réunion constructed to link open areas across a hollow road.

== Château du Petit Trianon ==
The château du Petit Trianon is a building located on the grounds of Marie Antoinette's estate in the parc de Versailles, in the French department of Yvelines in the Île-de-France region.

Built by King Louis XV's architect, Ange-Jacques Gabriel, between 1762 and 1768, it is considered a masterpiece of Neoclassicism, combining the most modern taste with integration into the surrounding natural environment.

Built for Madame de Pompadour, who died before it was completed, it was inaugurated by Madame du Barry in 1768, almost twenty years after the first gardens were laid out in the King's new garden. Although it was the most imposing building on the Petit Trianon estate, it was not the first, but rather the continuation of a project spanning four decades. On his accession to the throne, Louis XVI gave it to his young wife Marie Antoinette, who gave it her stamp; forever associating the building with her.

With a square floor plan measuring twenty-three metres on each side, the building owes its distinctiveness to its four façades comprising five high windows punctuated by Corinthian columns or pilasters. Due to the sloping ground, the ground floor of the château is only accessible from the south and east sides; this floor is reserved for service areas. The 'noble' floor, entered via a grand staircase in a vestibule designed as an inner courtyard, contains the reception rooms and the Queen's rooms. A mezzanine with three rooms houses Marie Antoinette's library. On the attic floor, several apartments that once belonged to Louis XV and his entourage now evoke the 'ladies of Trianon', aka the other women who once used it.

The decoration, entrusted by the architect Ange-Jacques Gabriel to Honoré Guibert, is entirely based on nature and a taste for antiquity. A true architectural extension of the neighbouring gardens, the château is adorned with sculptures of flowers and fruit, the paintings are allegories of the seasons or flowers, and the furniture is embellished with rural motifs.

A symbol of the new monarchy, which aspired for more intimacy and tranquillity than the permanent representation imposed by Louis XIV, the Petit Trianon also reflected the fragility of the system condemned by the Revolution of 1789. Nevertheless, the 'women's palace' remained spared by the years, benefiting in the 19th century from the infatuation of Marie Louise, Hélène de Mecklembourg-Schwerin, and Eugénie de Montijo. The restoration campaigns carried out at the beginning of the 21st century have restored most of the grounds to the look as they had on the day Marie Antoinette left it for the last time.

Together with the château de Versailles and its outbuildings, it was listed as a historic monument in 1862 and by decree of 31 October 1906; and has been a UNESCO World Heritage Site since 1979. It is now open to the public as part of the musée national des châteaux de Versailles et de Trianon, within the Domaine de Marie-Antoinette.

=== Construction ===
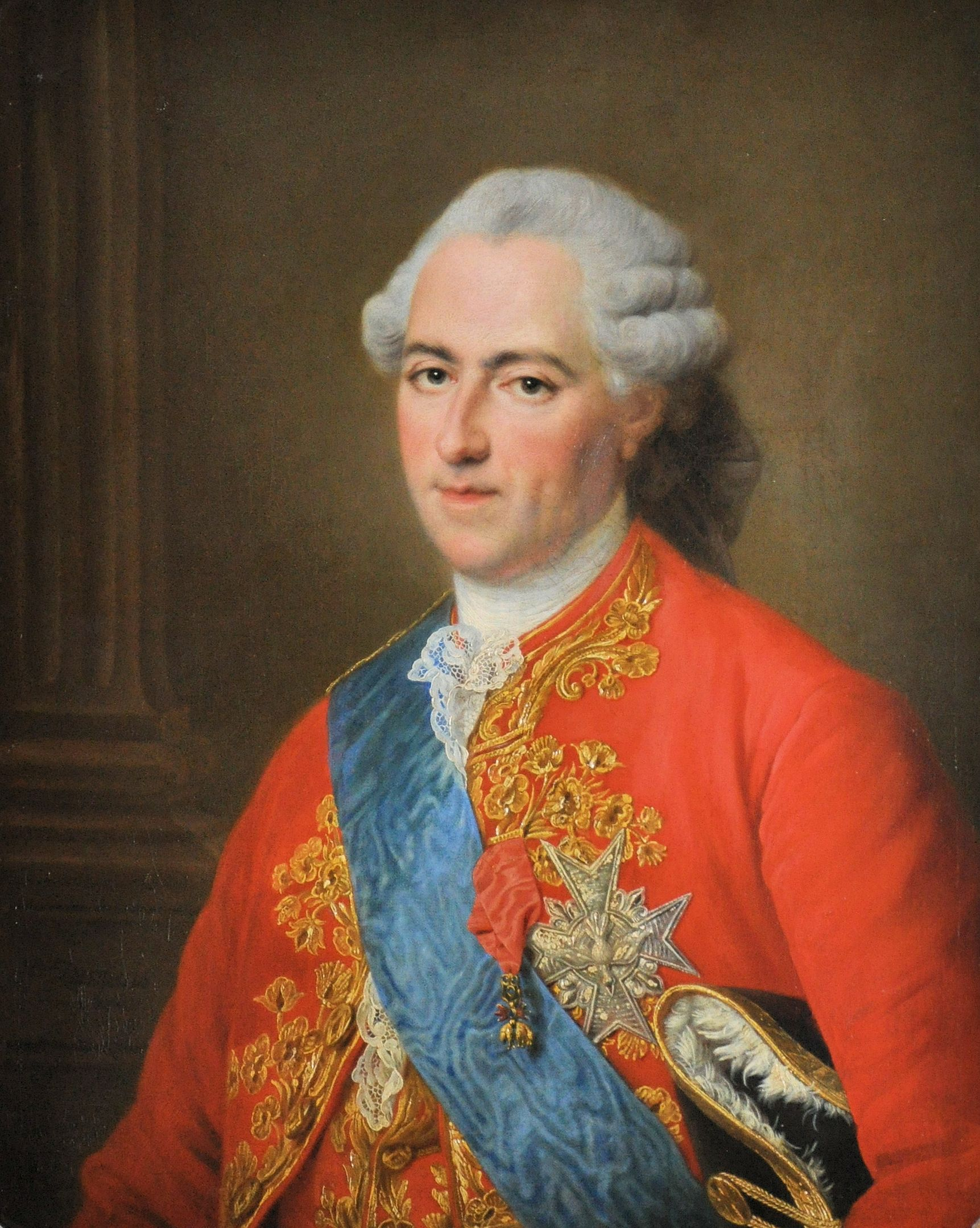
Portrait of Louis XV François-Hubert Drouais, 1773

In 1749, King Louis XV decided to regain possession of Trianon, which he had 'loved so much' as a child, but from which the pain he had felt in this refuge on the occasion of several bereavements had distanced him. Encouraged by his favourite, Madame de Pompadour, he had several buildings constructed on new plots of land to the north-east of the marble château, reviving the idea of a small country fantasy that had once prevailed at his grandfather's porcelain Trianon. A ménagerie was devoted to farm and barnyard animals, and two small pavilions were built within a new formal garden.

This garden space, the King's new garden, which allowed the King to develop his taste for botany and horticulture, was soon no longer sufficient. In 1758 thought began to be given to the construction of a small country château to close off the perspective of the French parterres. The first sketches were inspired by the prince de Croÿ's brand-new Château de l'Hermitage, designed according to a centred plan.

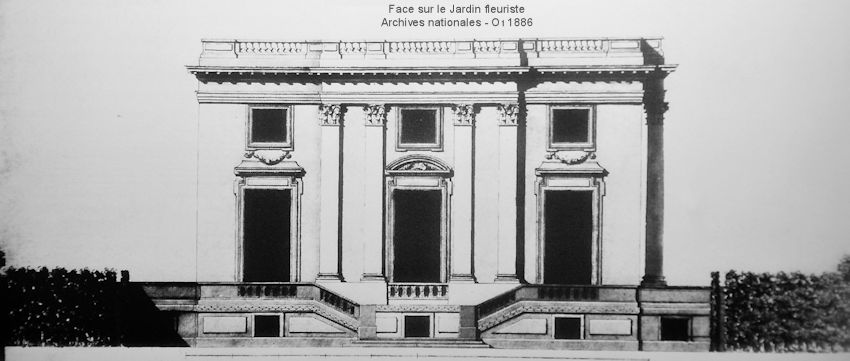
Unfinished project for the façades overlooking the botanical garden and the florist garden

The project was delayed by the Seven Years' War, but these events allowed more time for reflection and fixed the hesitations of the first plans. The 1761 plan included only three windows per façade. Only the façade overlooking the botanical gardens has four transoms without a projection, but it is poorly adapted to the levelling. A circular pediment tops each central crossing, the whole being richly decorated, even overloaded. The proportions are poorly balanced and the staircases are too modest. It was not convincing and failed to overcome the indecision to which the King was often subjected.

The idea, later described as 'brilliant', was to increase the number of crossbeams per façade to five, giving the building more majesty than the first drafts and satisfying the demands of the site. The principle of four pilasters or columns, depending on the cardinal orientation, which regularly punctuate the high windows, was retained. In the end, stereotomy was preferred, characterised by purely geometric ornamental decoration. The building had a square plan and its dimensions, twelve toises per sideé, (Note: Twelve toises correspond to approximately 23 m.) were determined by the width of the French garden. This choice of colossal order gave the building, despite its modest dimensions, a monumental character while preserving the harmony of its proportions.

The final decision was taken on 20 May 1762, and 700.000 livres were allocated to the construction as soon as the Treaty of Paris ending the Seven Years' War was signed. Louis Le Dreux de La Châtre, one of the best architects in Ange-Jacques Gabriel's team, was commissioned to build what is still known as the 'King's Pavilion'. Seventy-five stonemasons and one hundred and twenty masons were mobilised. The foundations were laid at the end of 1762. The structural work was carried out over the next two years, and the building was roofed in 1764. During the campaigns of 1765 to 1768, the sculptures, joinery, metalwork, and painting were completed. To give the decoration a fresh look, the King's traditional sculptors, Jacques Verbeckt and Jules-Antoine Rousseau, were replaced by a new artist, Honoré Guibert, who worked 'in the Grec style'.

Although the building was described as a masterpiece, it was not for its innovation or originality. Quite simply, the architect was able to assimilate various references, draw inspiration from the inventions and trends of the day, and assemble the best models from the most admired houses. This almost self-evident balance between the ancient and the modern–two seemingly incompatible genres–is concealed behind an apparent simplicity: in his novelty, Gabriel adds the elegance of the 18th century to the strength and nobility of the classicism inherited from Mansart.

== The 'women's château' ==
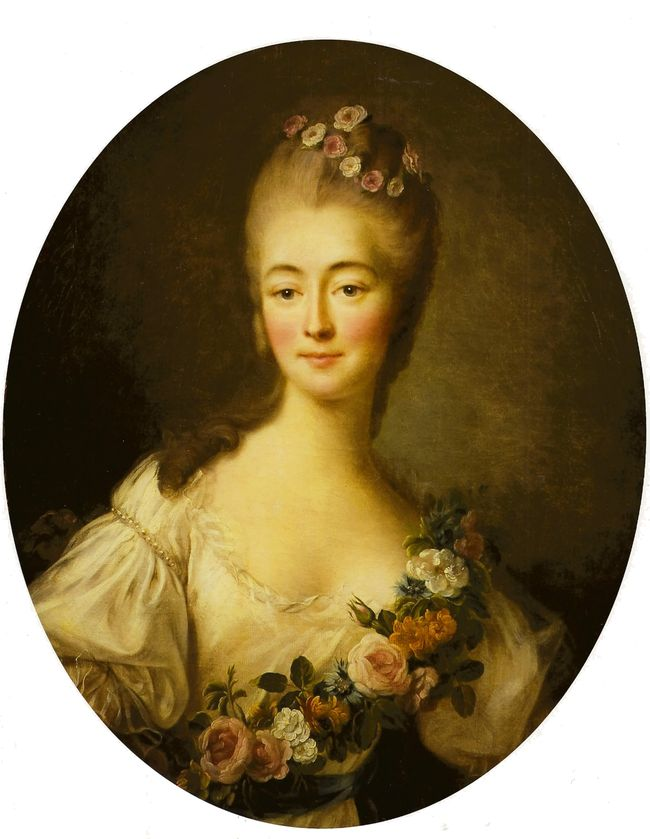
Portrait of Madame du Barry as Flore by François-Hubert Drouais, 1769

=== From Pompadour to du Barry ===
The château was not completed until 1768, four years after the death of Madame de Pompadour. It was therefore used by Madame du Barry, Louis XV's new favourite. While the Grand Trianon remained the venue for parties and receptions, the Petit Trianon quickly became a place of intimacy. Pompadour had marked the project with avant-garde refinement in terms of art and decoration. The château was dedicated to flowers, the main ornament, but it belonged to the King: beyond the symbolism of the royal mistresses, the notion of harmony between the decoration and the surrounding gardens was omnipresent.

In a departure from his status as King, Louis XV gave up his inner chambers, the best situated in the château, to Madame du Barry, who made them her bedroom, while he took up residence in the attic. She was the first to stay regularly at the Petit Trianon, far from the hostility of the King's daughters and the Dauphin. It was in this château that the King, who came in the company of his favourite on 26 April 1774, felt the first symptoms of the illness that took his life two weeks later. The royal mistress, who had already been away from Versailles for five days, did not return, having received a missive (Note: The apocryphal memoirs referred to a "lettre de cachet", when in fact it was a letter from the Secretary of State, kept at the National Archives under the reference O1416.) from the new King, transmitted by the duc de la Vallière, instructing her to go to the convent of Pont-aux-Dames.

=== Marie Antoinette ===
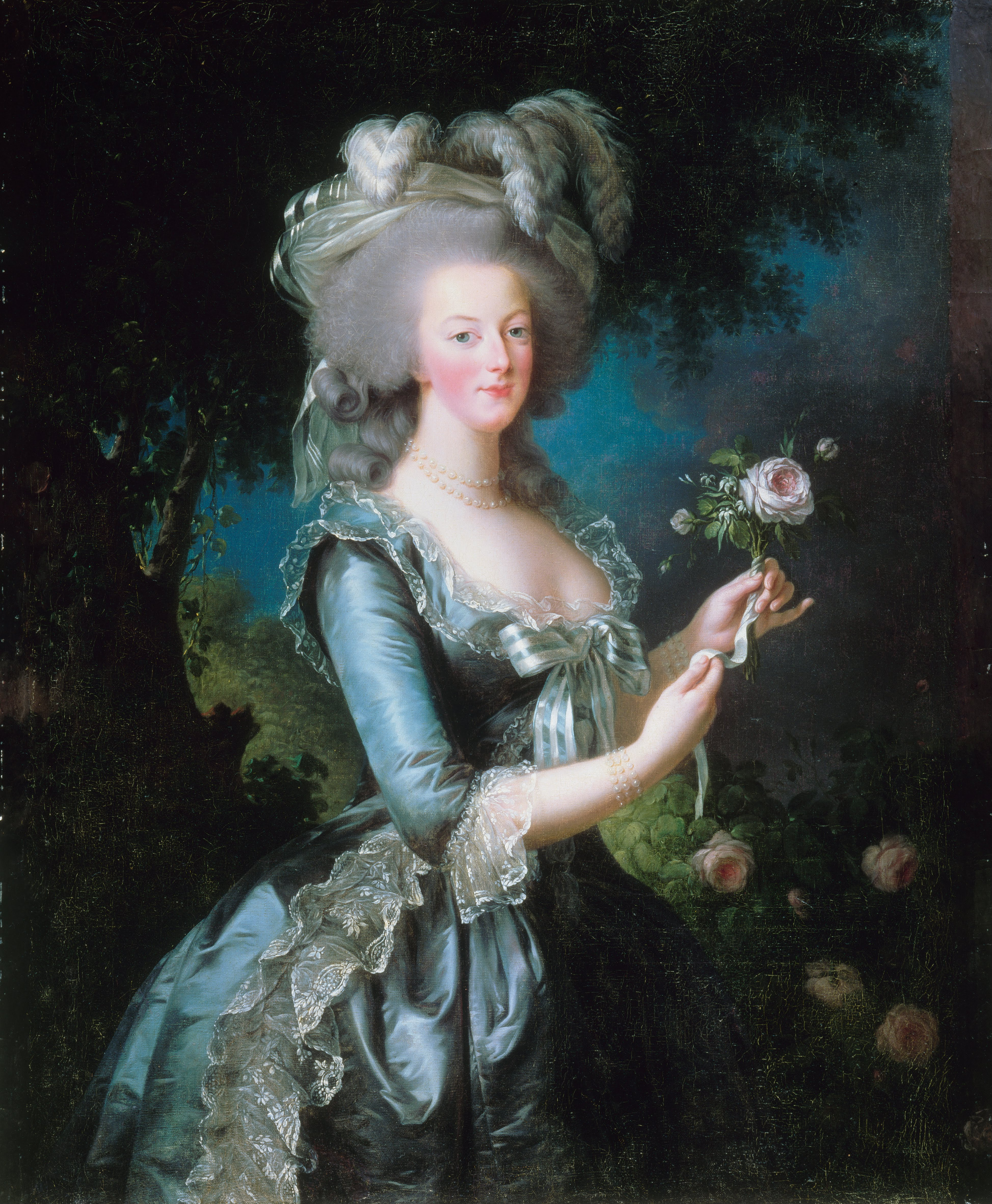
'Marie-Antoinette à la rose' by Louise Élisabeth Vigée Le Brun, 1783

For the first time, a Queen of France became the owner of a château: in June 1774, Marie Antoinette received the Petit Trianon as a gift from her husband, the new King Louis XVI. The place suited her aspirations perfectly, and she felt at home in the floral atmosphere that she had wanted but had not decided on: The bowls of fruit carved into the paneling by Guibert, the metamorphoses of divinities into flowers according to the wishes of Cochin and the brushes of Lépicié or Jollain, the country scenes composed by Lagrenée or Vien, the flower gardens and botanical gardens beneath her windows designed by Richard or Jussieu, the floral motifs on the furniture by Foliot or Joubert, everything was designed to satisfy the Queen's aspiration to escape the constraints of the court of Versailles to a world devoted to nature.

During the first few years, she made very few alterations. Her attempt to remove two paintings in the main dining room that offended her modesty was in vain. She inscribed her monogram on the banister of the staircase and removed the northeast staircase. It was only later, after completing her major garden landscaping project, that she undertook some renovations to her apartments.

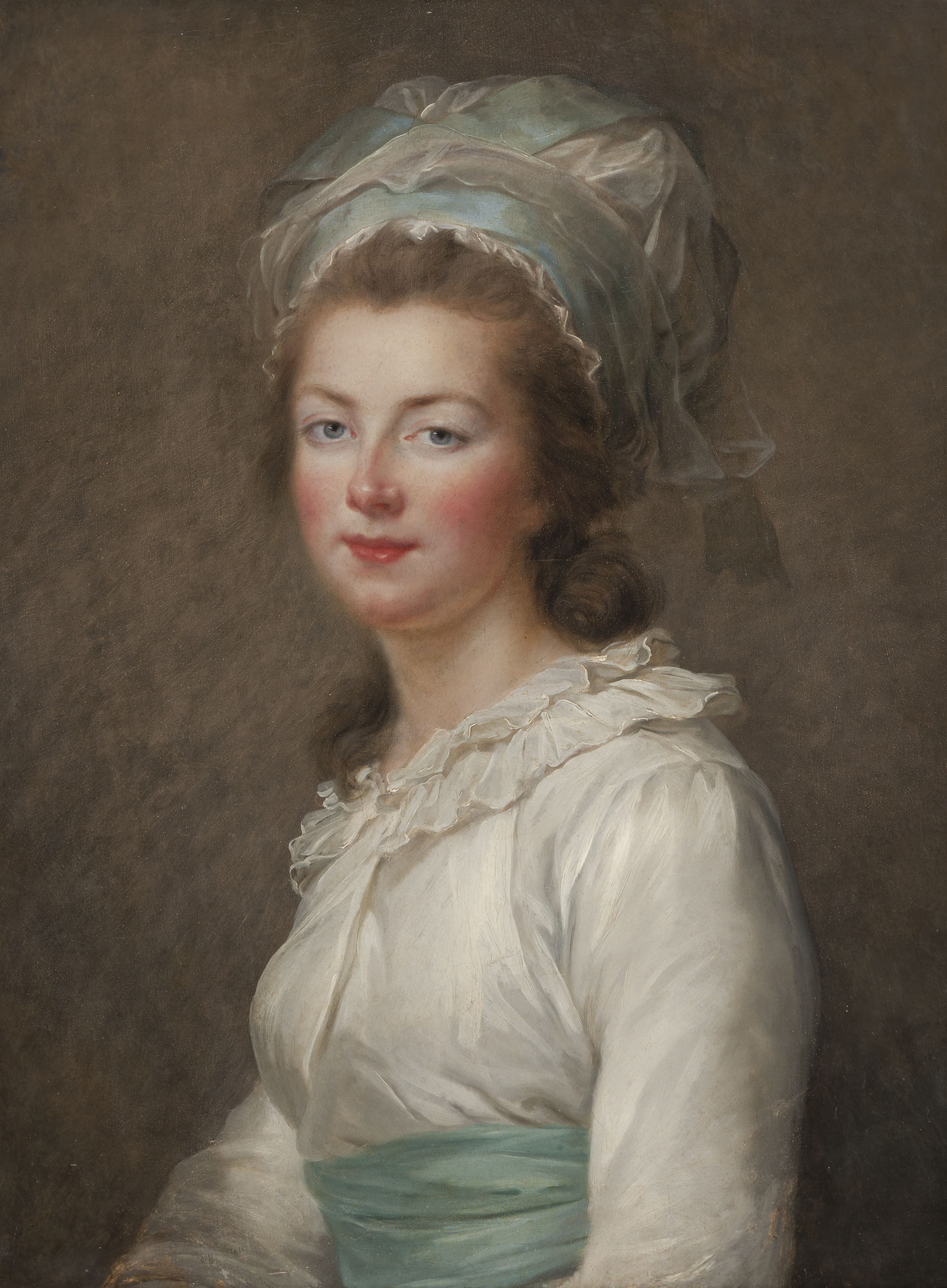
Madame Élisabeth, after Louise Élisabeth Vigée Le Brun

In defiance of protocol, the Queen got into the habit of staying at 'her' château, with the King only coming to dine as a guest. Rules were made 'in the name of the Queen', not of the King; Marie Antoinette behaved like a simple lady of the manor, breaking away from royal ceremony and dress: 'At Trianon, I have no court, I live there as a private person'. She entertained her intimates: they played, sang, danced, played music, and strolled through the gardens. Men were invited, but neither they nor the King slept in the château. The women were the mistresses of the house, and several of them stayed in the Queen's suite: Madame Élisabeth, who looked after Madame Royale, Madame de Polignac, the princesse de Chimay, the comtesse d'Ossun, and Madame Campan. In ten years, she spent 116 days in her château.

This lifestyle was worthy of a calm youth with apparent simplicity, luxury, and pleasure. This story of a sovereign dreaming only of privacy was quickly turned into the most terrible rumours against Marie Antoinette.

=== Pauline Bonaparte and Marie Louise ===
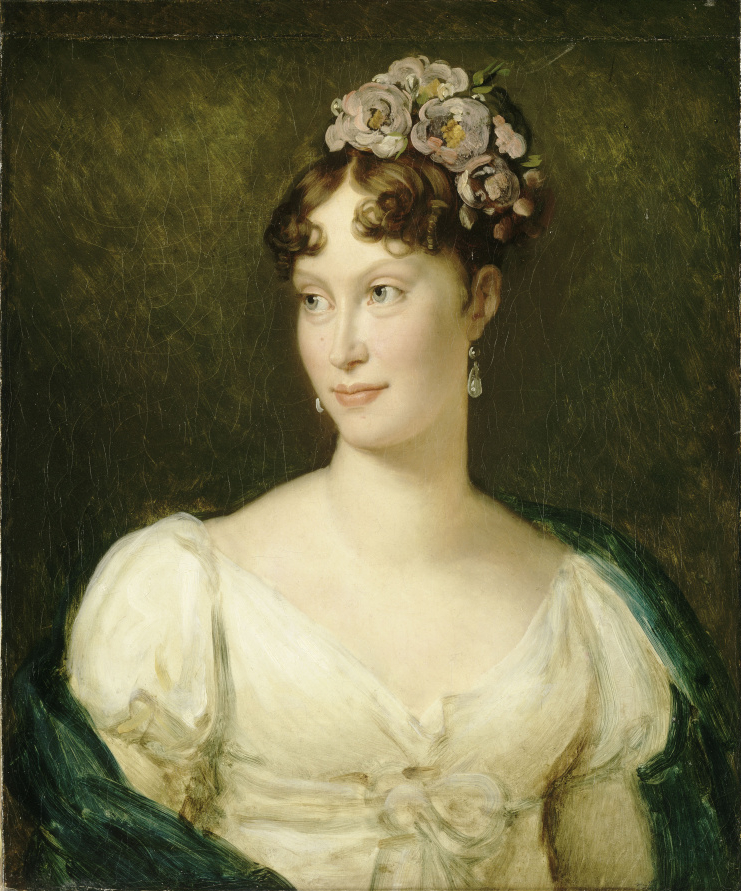
Portrait of Marie Louise by François Gérard, 1812, Musée du Louvre

The Petit Trianon, abandoned following the departure of the royal family in 1789, stripped of all its furniture at the auctions of 1793, and even temporarily transformed into a hotel, was made available to Pauline Borghese, favourite sister of Napoleon Bonaparte, in keeping with the tradition of this residence, which remained the 'women's château'. In 1805 all the rooms were repainted in various shades of grey. Carpenter Benoît-François Boulard (Note: There is sometimes confusion with his cousin Michel-Jacques Boulard (1761–1825), an upholsterer and former valet to Marie Antoinette, who also worked for the Bonapartes.) was commissioned to refurnish the rooms similar to those of the ancien régime. Empress Joséphine, who would never use the Petit Trianon, was involved in the choice of fabrics and furniture, which were intended to be richer and more elegant than those of the ancien régime. Although the architect Trepsat ordered the return of the paintings deposited at the musée de Versailles during the Revolution, most of the frames remained empty during the Empire were replaced by wallpapers depicting landscapes or plain green. The work costed over 150.000 francs. The princess, who was very fond of the château, stayed there for almost two months in June and July 1805, then one last time in December 1809, when Napoleon returned to Trianon to prepare the estate for his new wife.

Pauline Bonaparte by Robert Lefèvre, 1806

The Empress, Archduchess Marie Louise of Austria, was the great-niece of the late Queen. Her marriage to Napoleon, whom she had been taught to hate, was a consequence of the 'Treaty of Schönbrunn', named after the palace where Marie Antoinette grew up. But she freed herself from these symbols and the difficult memories associated with the château, probably without thinking about it or out of inconsistency, and enjoyed Trianon. From the Grand, she escaped to the Petit, which, like Marie Antoinette, reminded her of the château de Laxenburg of her childhood. She stayed in her great-aunt's room, which had been completely redecorated, under a dome of silk embroidered in gold that concealed the original woodwork. She resumed the pre-1789 lifestyle: a ring game was reconstituted near the château, the small theatre was restored, and sumptuous parties were held in the gardens.

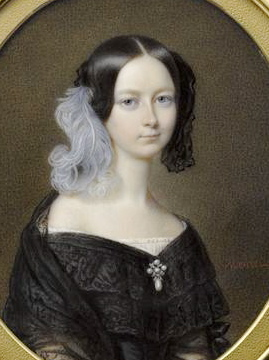
Hélène de Mecklembourg-Schwerin, duchesse d'Orléans, as a widow by François Meuret, circa 1843, musée Condé

=== The duchesse d'Orléans ===
With the so-called July Monarchy, the Orléans family moved to the Grand Trianon in 1837. The Petit Trianon was given to the young couple then destined to succeed Louis Philippe: the duc and duchesse d'Orléans. They occupied the former Queen's bedroom and an attic apartment, largely retaining the Empire furniture, which was nonetheless rearranged and redone. Very quickly, with two new cabinetmakers, Alphonse Jacob-Desmalter and Louis-Édouard Lemarchand, providing additional new furniture, the château was refurbished to provide a different level of comfort. It was also adapted to modern conveniences, with the creation of two small bathrooms in the centre of the building and a private spiral staircase allowing better communication between the spouses' apartments. The residence was no longer a royal palace but a country home, adapted to the tastes of the time. The duchess, who continued to stay at Trianon after her husband's accidental death, was no longer fond of the château, which she found sad, considering herself to be 'in exile'. The place fell into oblivion after the departure of this last princess.

=== Under Eugénie de Montijo ===
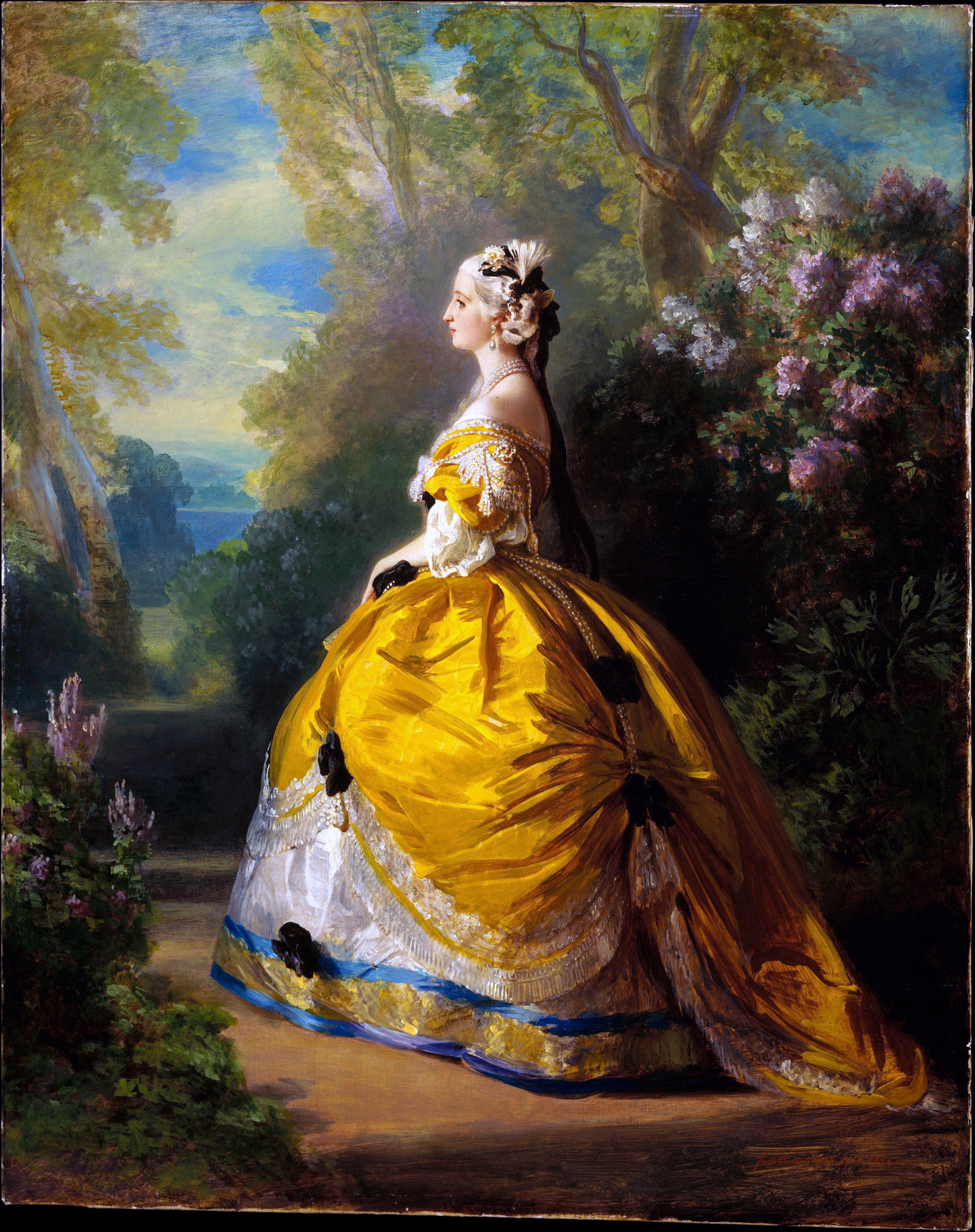
Empress Eugenie in Marie Antoinette-style dress by Franz Xaver Winterhalter, 1854, Metropolitan Museum of Art

Eugénie de Montijo felt a sympathy for Marie Antoinette that verged on devotion and created a veritable cult to her, so much so that this need for identification, pushed to the point of syncretism, can be seen in paintings by Franz Xaver Winterhalter depicting her in an evocation of the gardens of the Petit Trianon (Note: See the portrait of Empress Eugénie surrounded by her ladies-in-waiting.) or in a late 18th-century style dress. (Note: This painting by Franz Xaver Winterhalter is on display at the Metropolitan Museum of Art.) On the occasion of the Universal Exhibition of 1867, the Empress wanted to organise a retrospective homage to the sovereign, welcoming the fact that 'her soul, after more than a century of wandering, was finally returning to its haven at Trianon'. Eudore Soulié, the first true curator of the château de Versailles, was responsible for assembling the works. On the instructions of Louis-Joseph Napoléon Lepic, aide-de-camp to Napoleon III and supervisor of the worksite, the small château was emptied of its Empire furniture, (Note: All the furniture of the First Empire was transferred to the Grand Trianon.) the façades cleaned, the paintings repainted, the damaged floors replaced and the doors repaired. In the absence of historical accuracy, the first floor was entirely furnished with 144 objects 'having been or presumed to have been for the Queen's use'. The restoration cost 5.000 francs. Following this event, the Petit Trianon became a museum dedicated to Marie Antoinette, the Queen whose myth was gradually beginning to take hold.

=== 20th and 21st centuries ===
For more than a century, little attention was paid to the château, despite the efforts of curators, architects, and historians to bring the presentation more in line with what the archives reveal. However, the resurgence in Marie Antoinette's popularity at the end of the 20th century, accompanied by the release of blockbuster films devoted to her which helped to propagate the myth, has once again shed light on this small country château of a Queen of France who was alternately adored and reviled.

== Description ==
The Neoclassical style is in contrast to the rocaille style of the Pavillon français, built by the same architect in 1750. Inspired by neo-Palladian architecture and possibly by drawings by Jean-François Chalgrin, the building, with its square plan and balustrade, rises over three levels and has a total surface area of 1.458 square metres. Surrounded by gardens, it can be seen from all sides, a form that was to be very popular until the end of the 18th century. Its four comparable façades, however, conceal subtle differences, dictated by the slope of the land, among other reasons. The façade facing west, the French Garden, is the richest: it is adorned with a forecourt of four isolated columns in the Corinthian style surmounted by capitals. (Note: Corinthian column capital with four suns and four dolphin tails, eight tigettes and small finials, eight large and eight medium masses, each split into five large olive leaves, with smooth ribs in the middle and rich reverse at the end" in Conflanso stone 2; these models are identical to those in the Gabriel wing or the Dufour pavilion.) On the south courtyard side, the ground floor is embossed horizontally, (Note: Gabriel's principle can also be found at the Château de Compiègne or Place Louis-XV.) while the main floor and attic are punctuated with Corinthian pilasters. The north-facing façade has the same composition, but with only the two upper storeys, it opens onto the English garden via two ramps similar to those on the west side. The eastern façade overlooking the former botanical garden has a ground floor entrance, also with horizontal bosses creating a continuous base is devoid of columns or pilasters, the main decoration being intended for the pleasure gardens, to the detriment of the glasshouses and flowerbeds reserved for study. The sculptures adorning the cornices, architraves and window frames are nevertheless identical on all four sides, indicating a certain severity in this return to antiquity. The Italian-style flat roof is concealed by a balustrade.

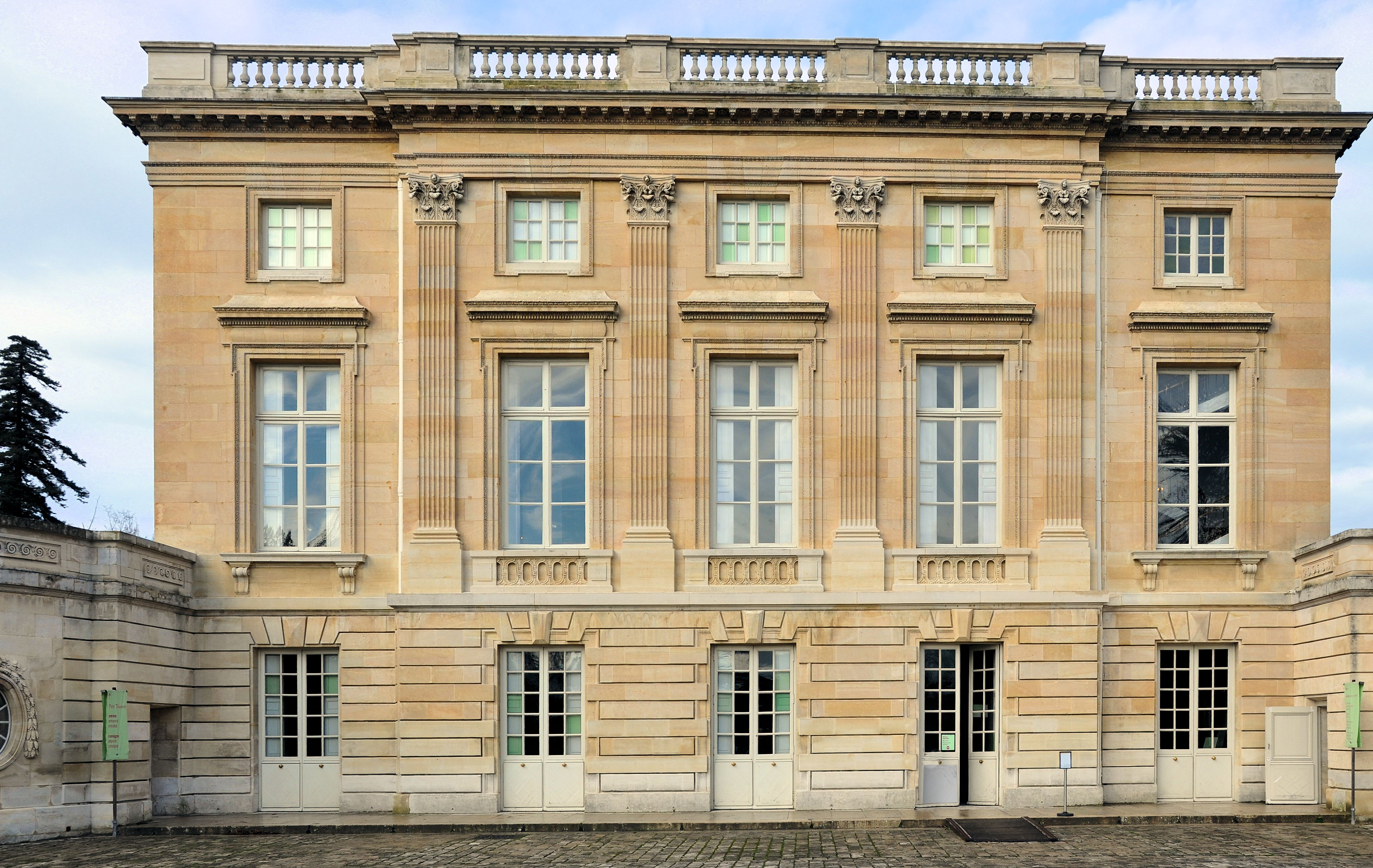
South façade facing the cour d'honneur, decorated with pilasters

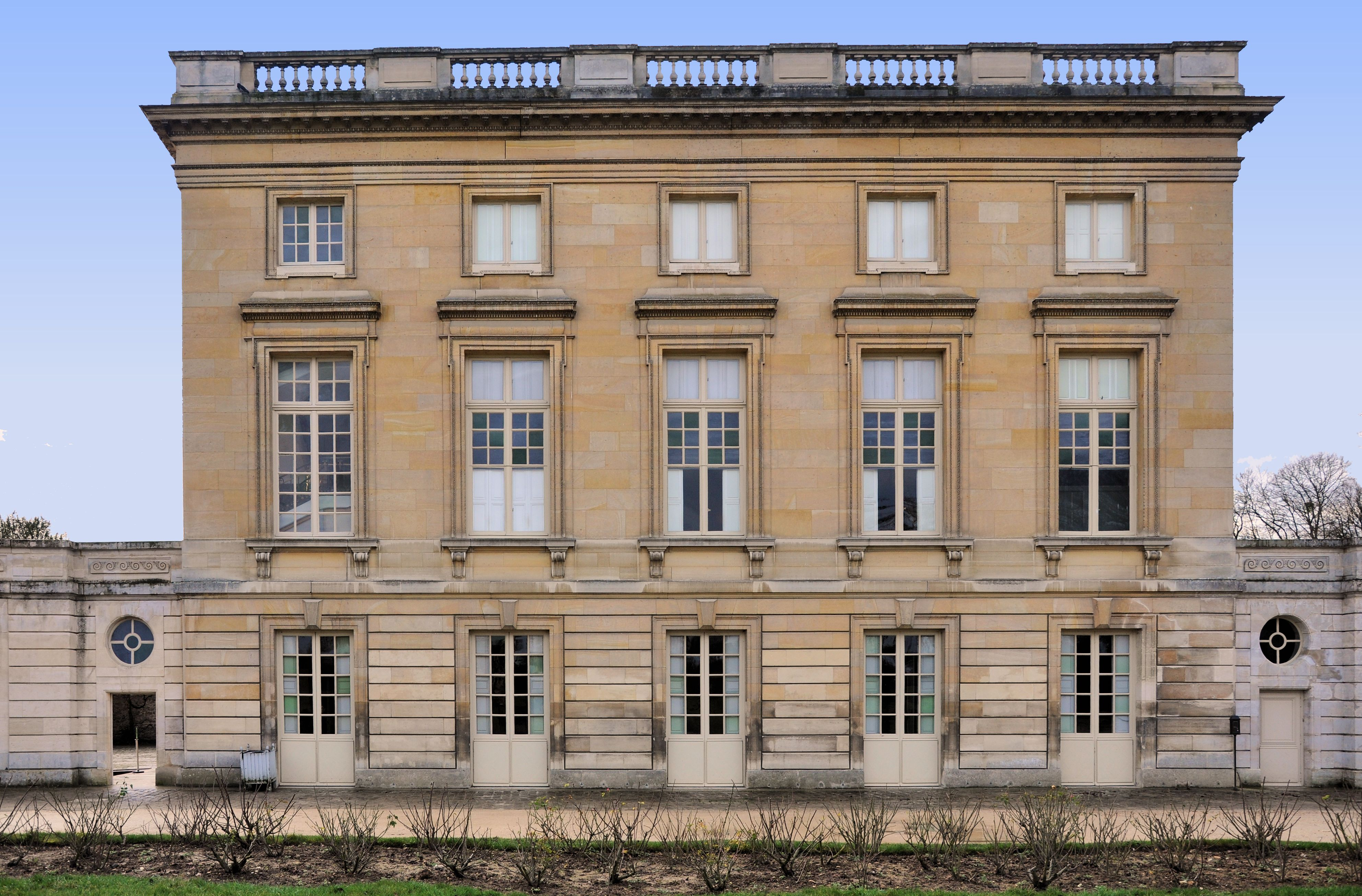
East façade overlooking the former botanical garden, without columns or pilasters

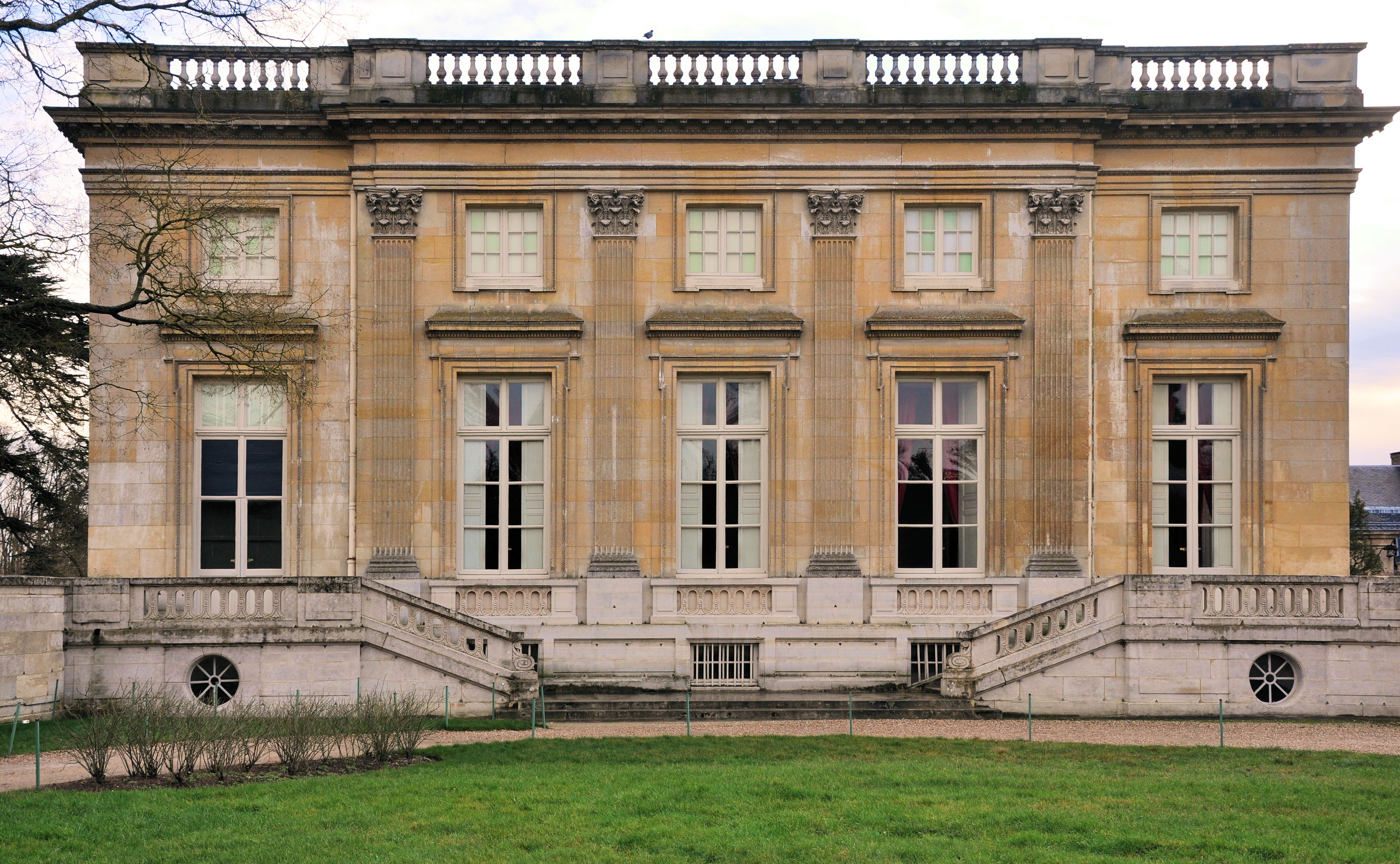
North façade overlooking the English garden, decorated with pilasters

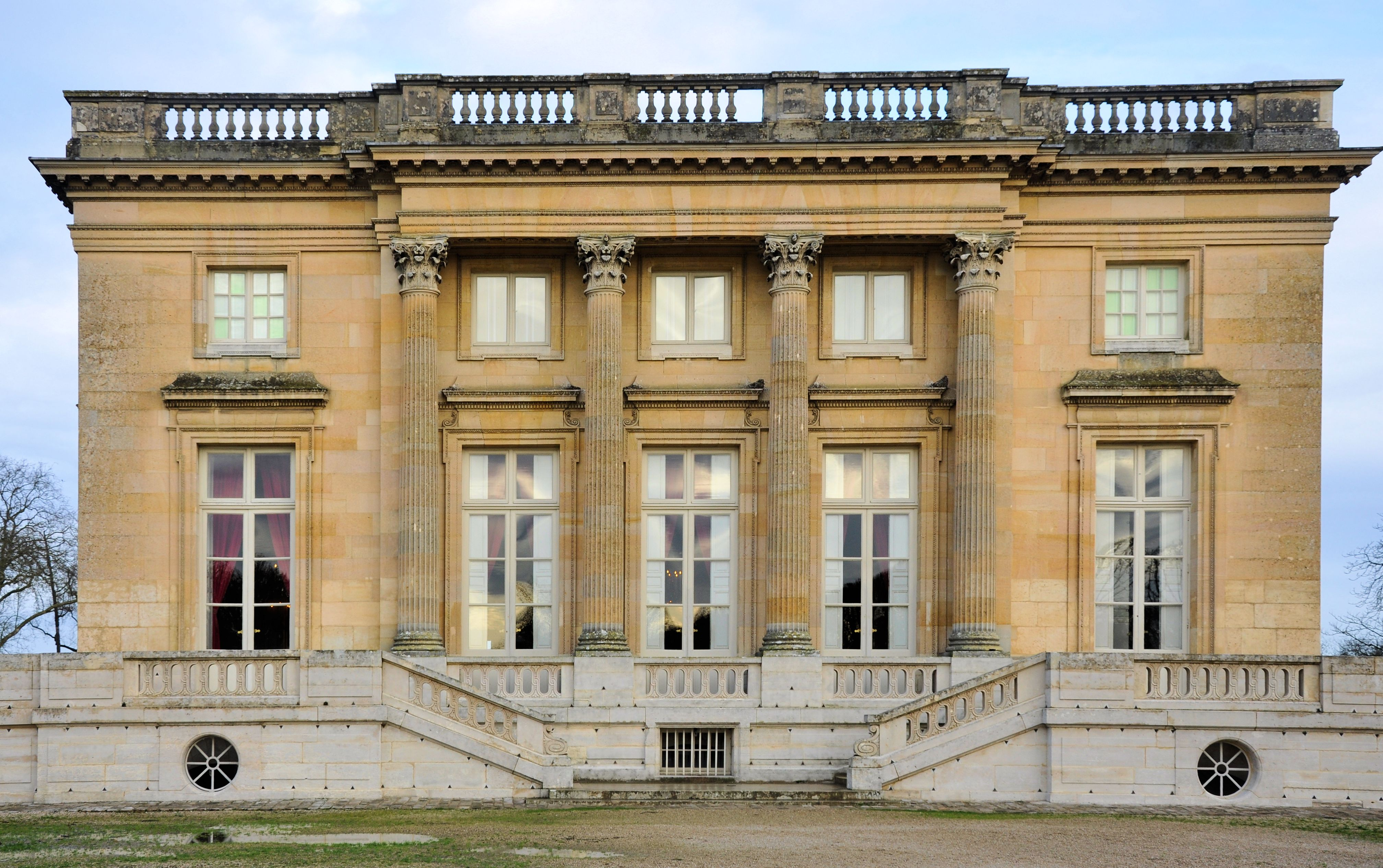
West façade overlooking the French garden, decorated with columns

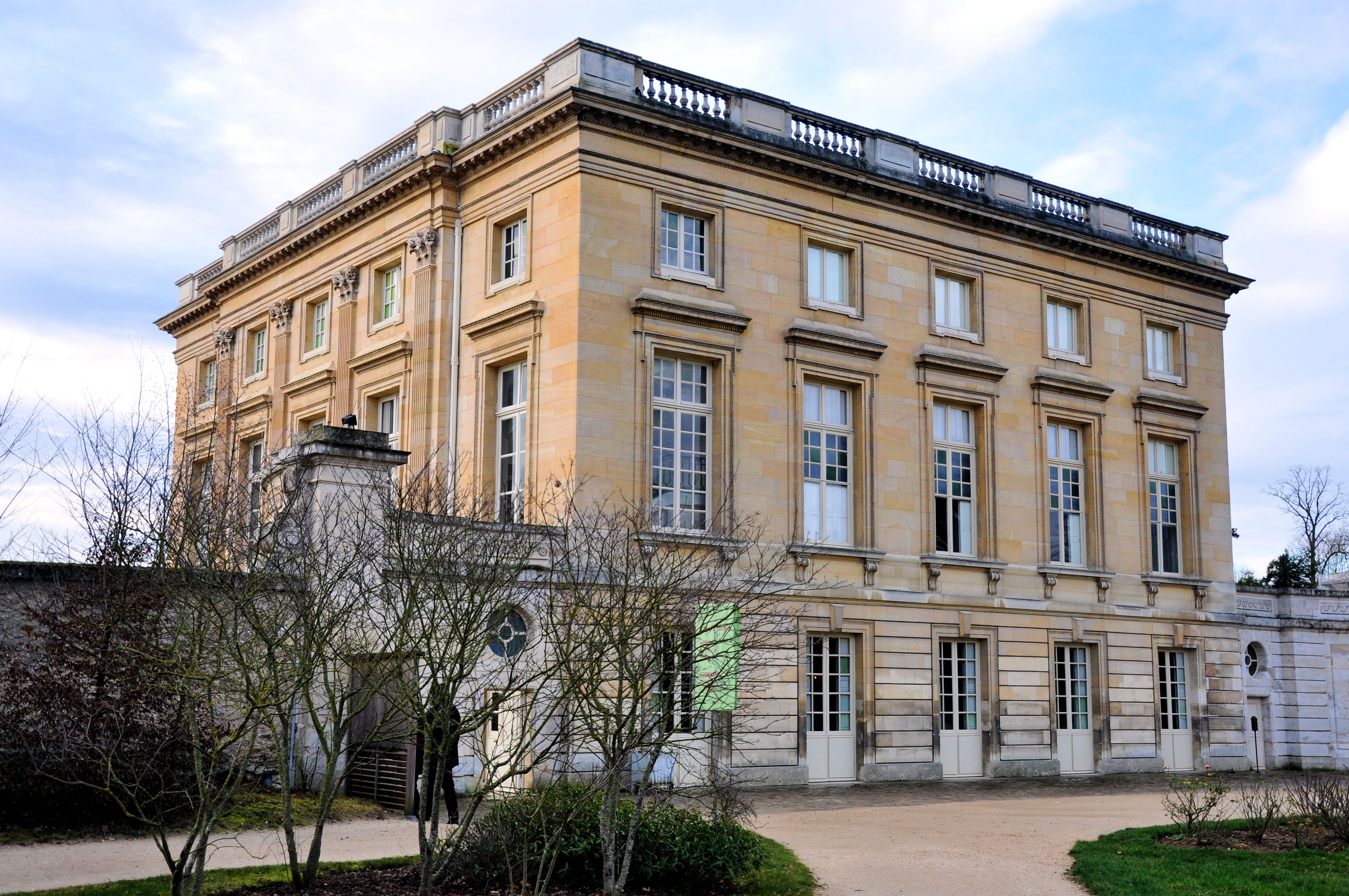
South and east façades

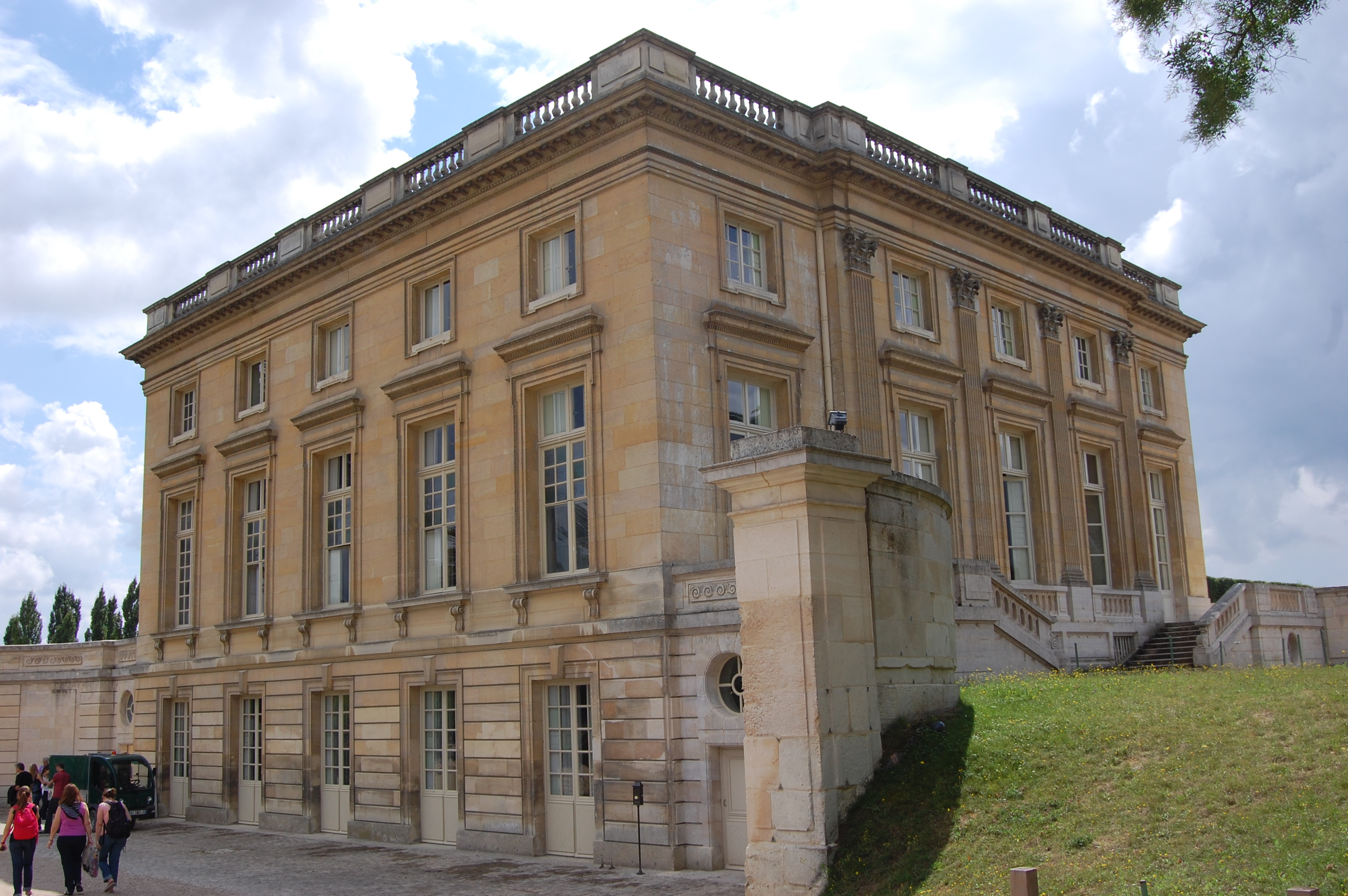
East and north façades

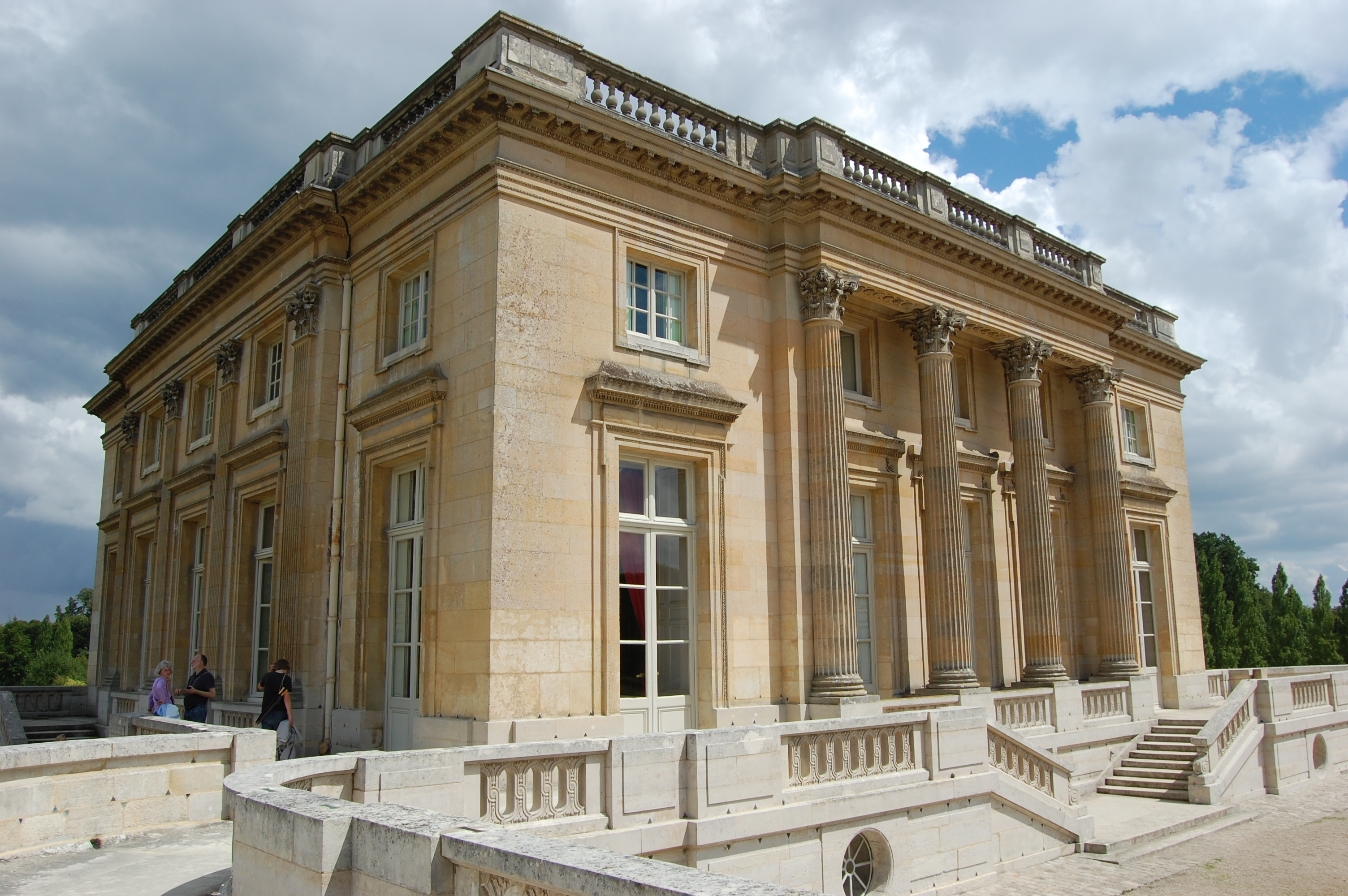
North and west façades

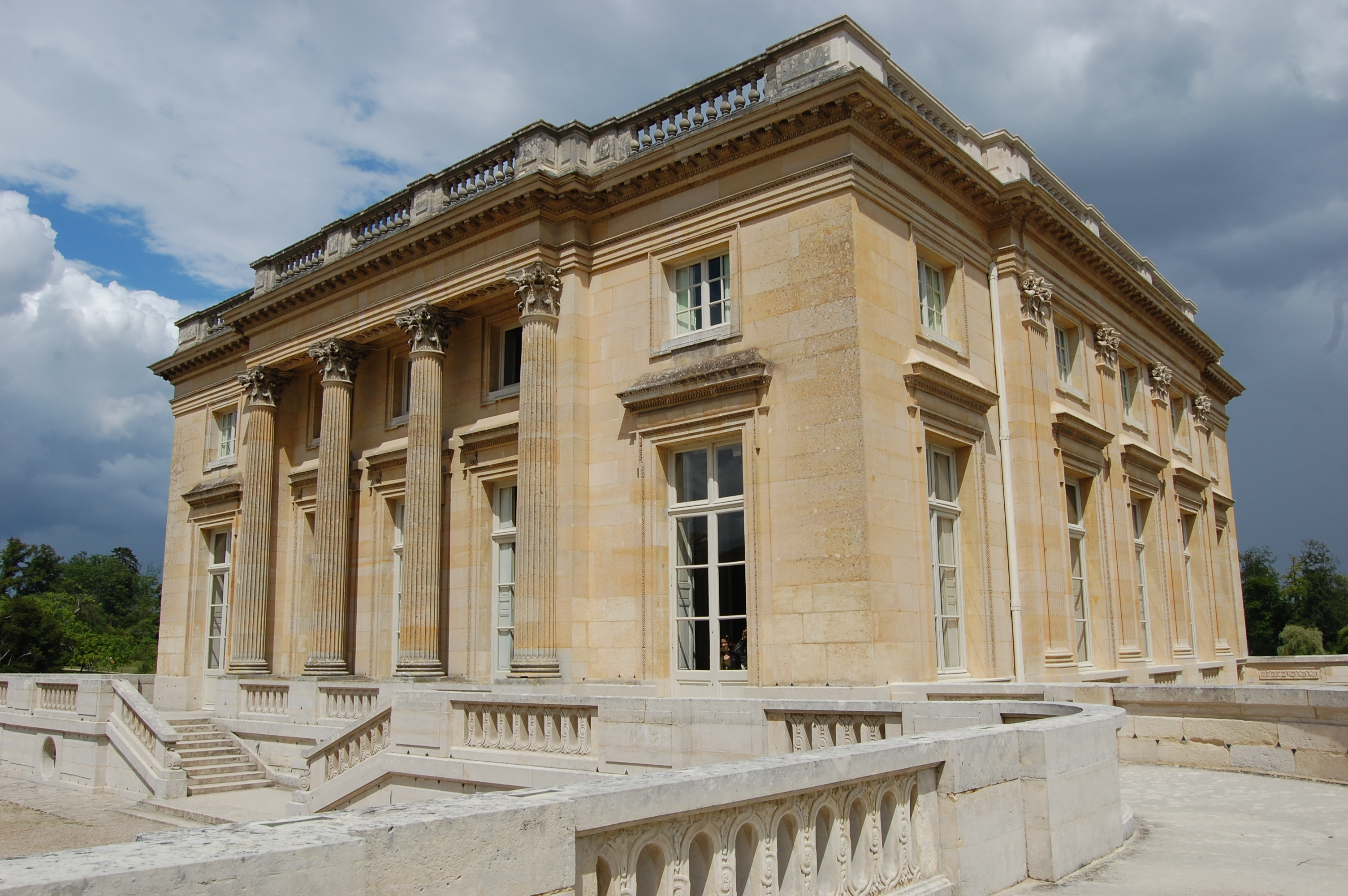
West and south façades

The decoration is marked by a subtle evolution in art and not by an absolute victory for modernity; while certain old habits remain, such as the shell or trophies of Love, they rub shoulders with new forms, in the sculpture or woodwork, whose motifs are directly inspired by the gardens of Trianon, such as the garlands of leaves or the profusion of fruit.

The ground floor, which is only accessible from the south and east sides due to the sloping ground, essentially houses the outbuildings. The terraces make it possible to conceal the passageways needed to service the Petit Trianon and in particular the connections with the ancillary buildings, such as the theatre and chapel. The first floor contains the reception rooms and the Queen's apartments. The King's chambers and the guests' rooms were located in the attic. The 'noble floor' is accessed directly from the porch. Seemingly open onto the gardens, the drawing room floor is located above a ground floor that overlooks, on the Versailles side, the small rectangular cour d'honneur rounded at the corners, redesigned in Marie Antoinette's time, framed by a small wall and a hedge of hornbeams and closed by a soft green gate flanked by two sentry boxes. Opposite is the avenue du Petit Trianon, which leads to the château de Versailles.

=== Ground floor ===
Plan of the ground floor of the Petit Trianon A. Guardroom B. Lobby C. Billiard room D. Silver room E. Boudoir (with moving mirrors) F. Warming room G. North vaulted gallery H. Ring gallery I. Fruit room 1 J. Fruit room 2 K. Gallery L. Chapel gallery

The ground floor, known in the 18th century as 'the underground passageways', is accessed via a vestibule with two doors opening onto a modest porch in the entrance courtyard to the south of the château. To the left is the guards' room and to the right is the billiard room, with the rest reserved for household use. Before the restoration work was completed in 2008, this floor was used to receive the public and provide services, and has now been returned to its original purpose; the entrance is via the Swiss house, as it was in the old days.

==== Lobby ====
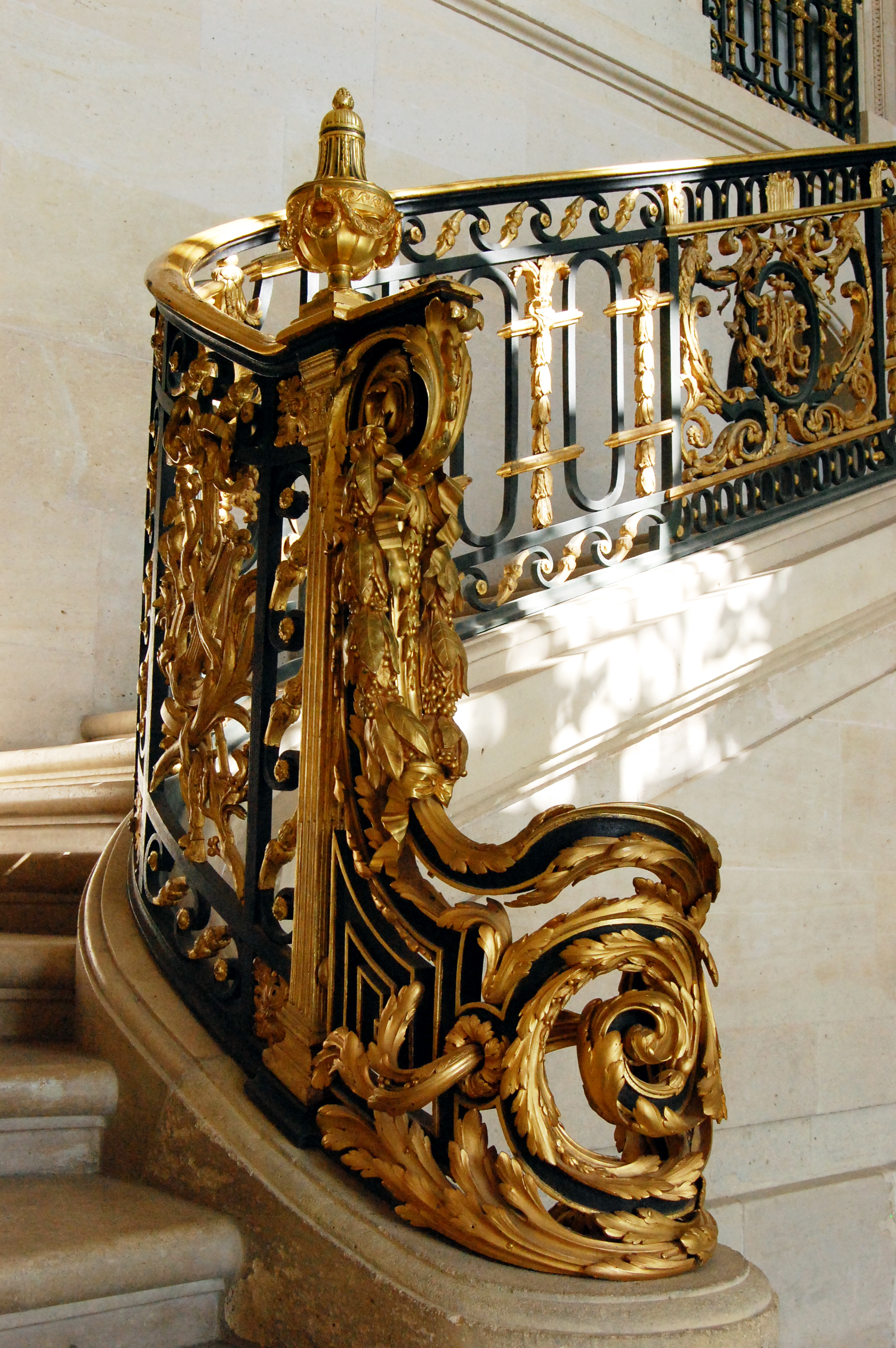
Start of the ramp

The vestibule leads to the château's main staircase, which has two straight flights, is built of Saint-Leu limestone and adorned with gilded bronze and wrought iron railing, the work of locksmiths Louis Gamain and François Brochois. It has a broad design punctuated by oval medallions with rooster heads, originally bearing the figure of Louis XV, (Note: it was two intertwined "Ls".) later replaced by that of Marie-Antoinette, and the letters M and A interlaced. The walls are simply decorated in ashlar, forming an ornamental transition between the interior and exterior. The floor is tiled in white veined marble and Campan green, a color reminiscent of the greenery in the gardens.

Set back under the flights of stairs, a door gives access to the low-vaulted warming room. On the half-landing of the staircase at the seventh step, another small door on the left leads to the former Chinese ring gallery via a long corridor created in 1781 – Marie-Antoinette's most important transformation of the château – and located under the terrace facing the French Garden.

==== Guards' room ====
An initial project in 1763 provided for a botanical library in this large room on the ground floor, but this was never built and, until the mid-19th century, it housed the bodyguards. For this reason, the décor was simple: the walls were decorated with a false stone panel and the parquet floor was made of thick planks. A few beds with mattresses and blankets had been installed, along with some storage units.

Following the restoration work in 2006–2008, the room now serves as an entrance for visitors to the estate, via a formerly closed corridor that links it to the chapel garden. The two paintings on display, by Austrian painter Johann Georg Weikert, were commissioned to be placed in the large dining room on the first floor and both depict the show given on 24 January 1765 at Schönbrunn on the honor of Joseph II's second marriage to the Princess of Bavaria. Marie-Antoinette had asked her mother Marie-Thérèse to make copies of these two paintings that she loved; in one of them, she appears at the age of ten dancing with her brothers (Note: Maximilien as Cupid and Ferdinand as the groom.) a ballet-pantomime by Gluck, while the other depicts her older sisters performing the four Muses in an opera. (Note: Marie-Josèphe as Euterpe, Marie-Élisabeth as Melpomène, Marie-Amélie as Apollon and Marie-Caroline as Érato.) On 18 March 1778 she received these works, of which she said: "They will increase the pleasure I get when I am in Trianon".

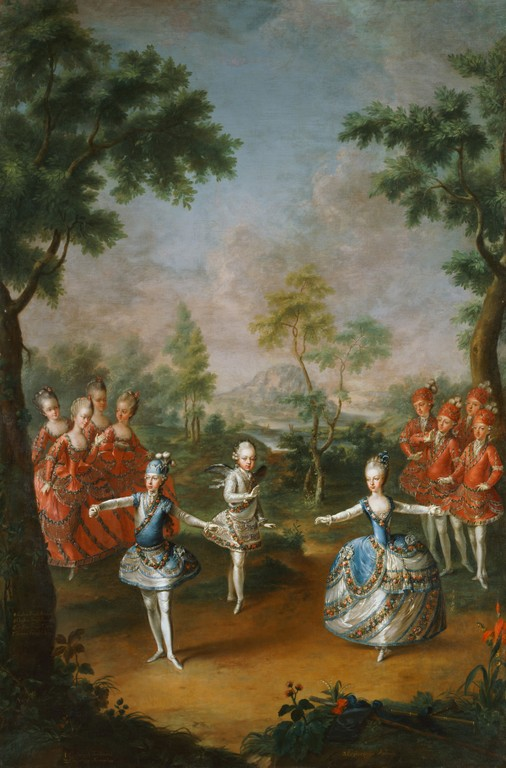
The Triumph of Love, Johann Georg Weikert

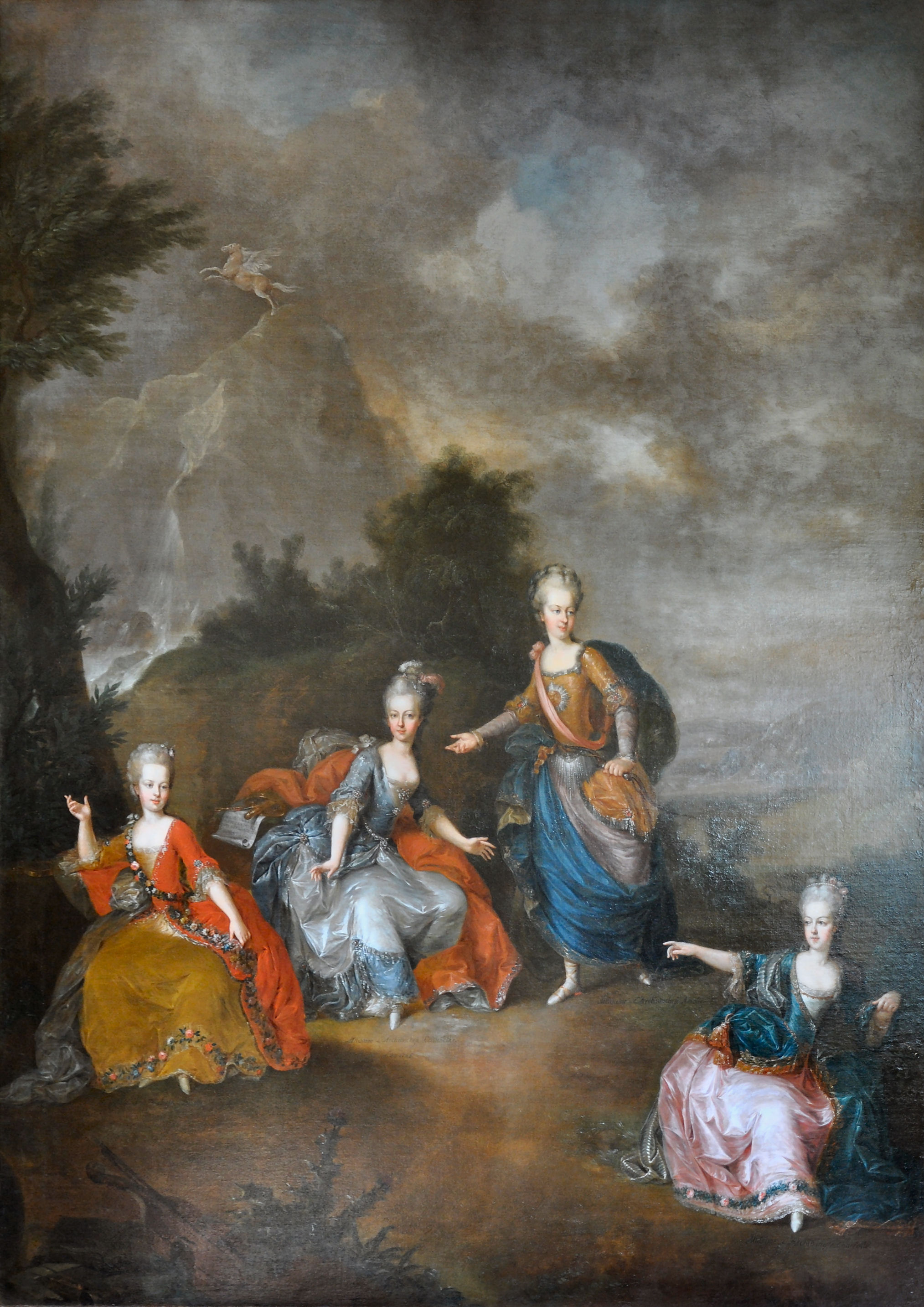
Scene from Il Parnaso Confuso, Johann Georg Weikert

==== Billiards room ====
This corner room on the ground floor originally housed Louis XV's billiard table, which has now disappeared. The one commissioned by Louis XVI in 1776 from Antoine-Henry Masson, paumier-billardier of the Roi, (Note: Antoine-Henry Masson (1722-?) ran both a billiard and a jeu de paume. He came from a family of master billiard players and his role was multifaceted: he supplied the court with billiards, marbles, and cues, as well as shuttlecocks and rackets, and played paume in front of Louis XV; he was considered to be the best at the time and even became pumier to Louis XVI's children.) measuring 414 by 219 cm, was made of solid oak and ivory, with fifteen turned legs. It was accompanied by twenty iron plates for the candles, twelve ivory balls for the Guerre or Carambole and around thirty tails, at a total cost of 3,000 livres. In 1784, Marie-Antoinette had it transferred to the first floor and it was replaced by another billiard table, of lesser elegance, for the officers of the guard. It was sold for 600 livres to a second-hand dealer called Rouger in 1794 during the revolutionary sales.

As the original billiard table had not been found, a restoration was undertaken in 2005 as part of a 50,000 euro skills sponsorship with the Chevillotte company, respecting the original materials and colors. (Note: Christian Baulez talks about the difficulties of restoring the original blue-green hue of the pure new wool carpet.) After being displayed in the château's Petits appartements du Roi, it was returned to its original position in 2008. (Note: At the same time, the reception of visitors, which used to take place in this room, has been moved to the Maison du Suisse.)

The walls are fully paneled and the herringbone parquet flooring has also been restored according to the original plans. On the mantelpiece is a plaster bust of Marie-Antoinette based on the marble work by Louis-Simon Boizot, commissioned in 1781 by the Comte de Vergennes, Secretary of State for Foreign Affairs. Two paintings hang on the wall: one by Élisabeth Vigée Le Brun depicts the Queen and the other, the royal family. (Note: This painting, acquired by the Société des amis de Versailles in 1995, was first attributed to Élisabeth Vigée Le Brun and then to the Vaud painter Louis-Auguste Brun, known as Brun de Versoix (1758–1815), but these attributions are now disputed. All that is known is that it was painted in early 1782.)

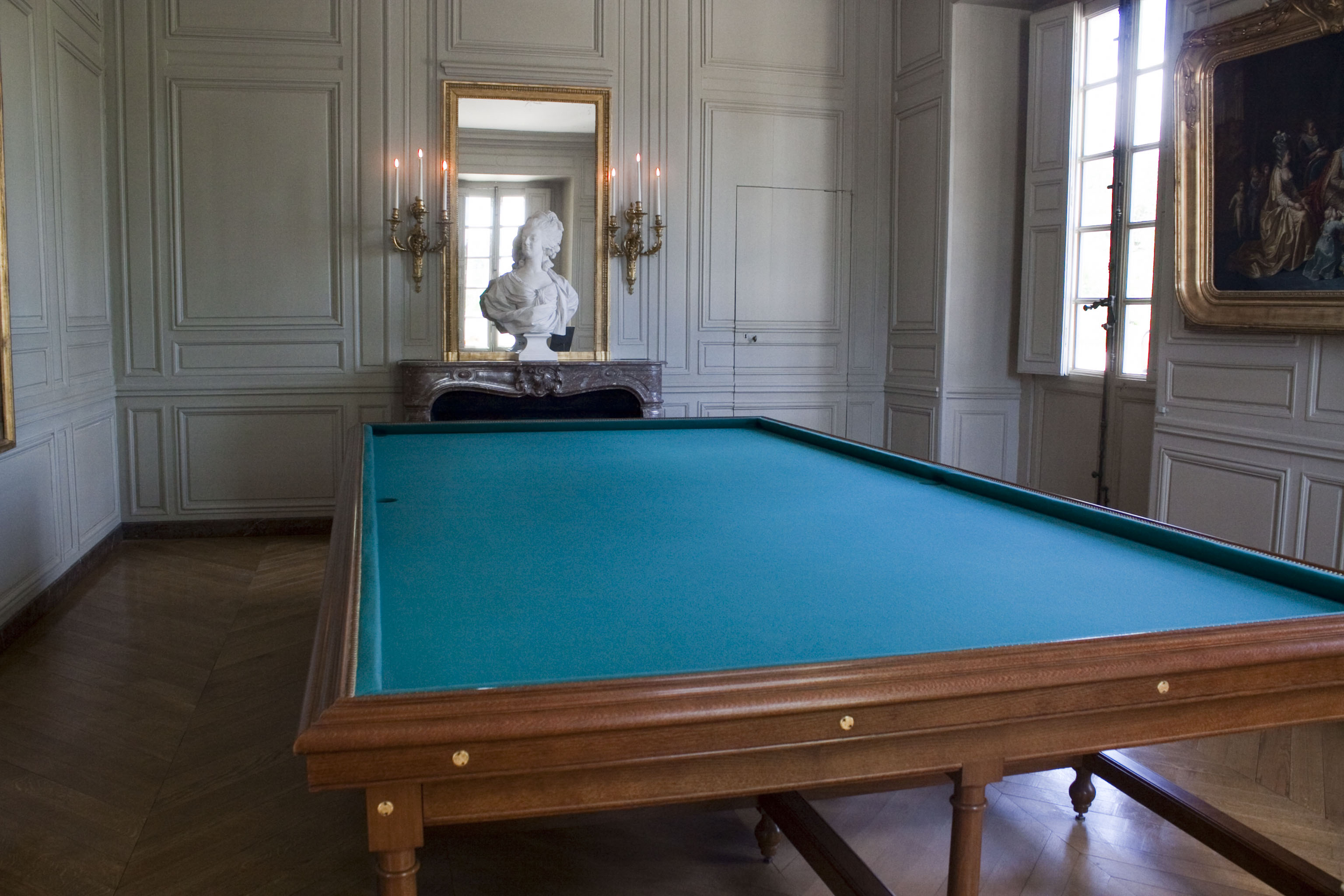
Louis XVI's billiard table returned

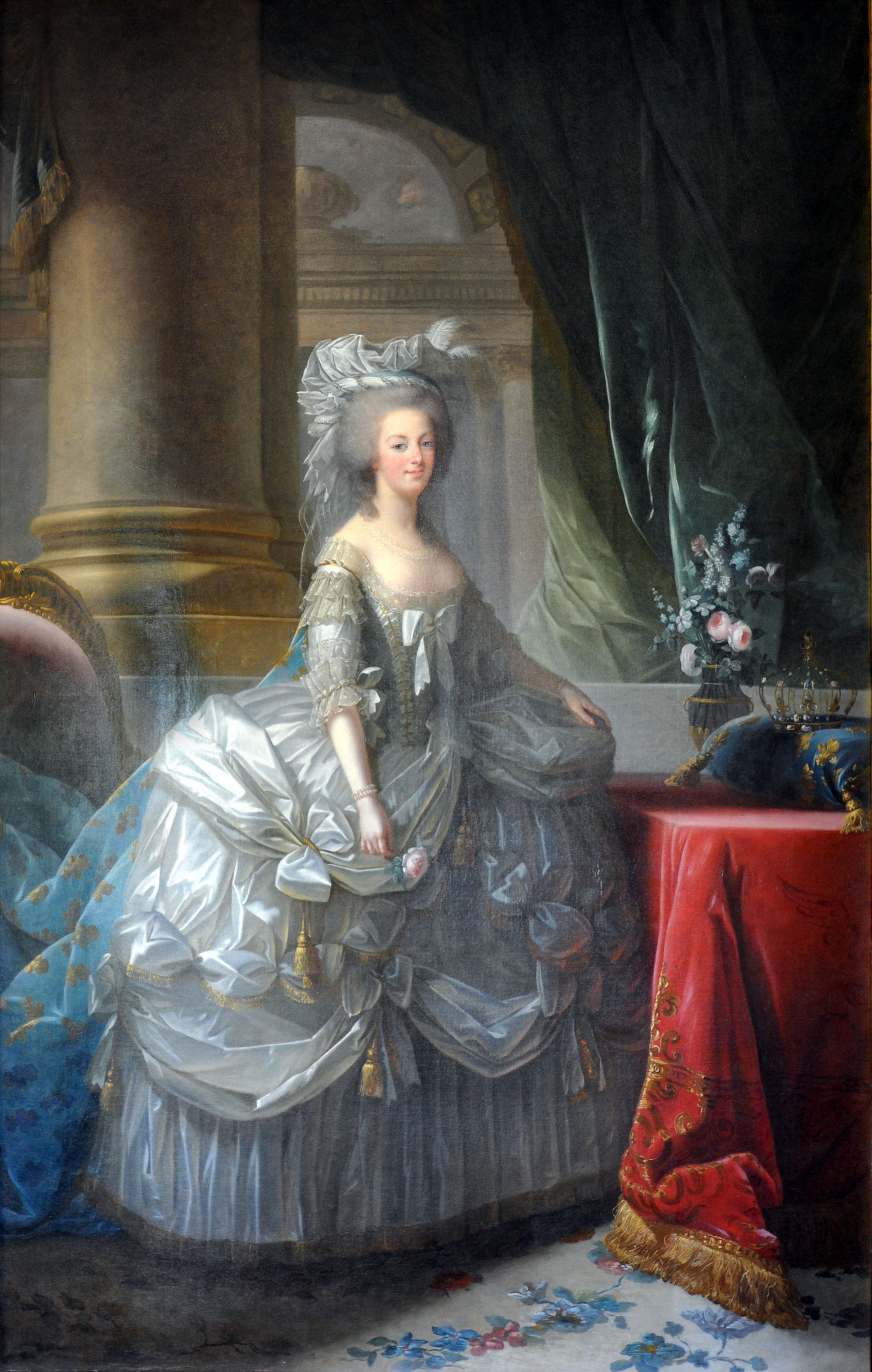
Marie-Antoinette Élisabeth Vigée Le Brun

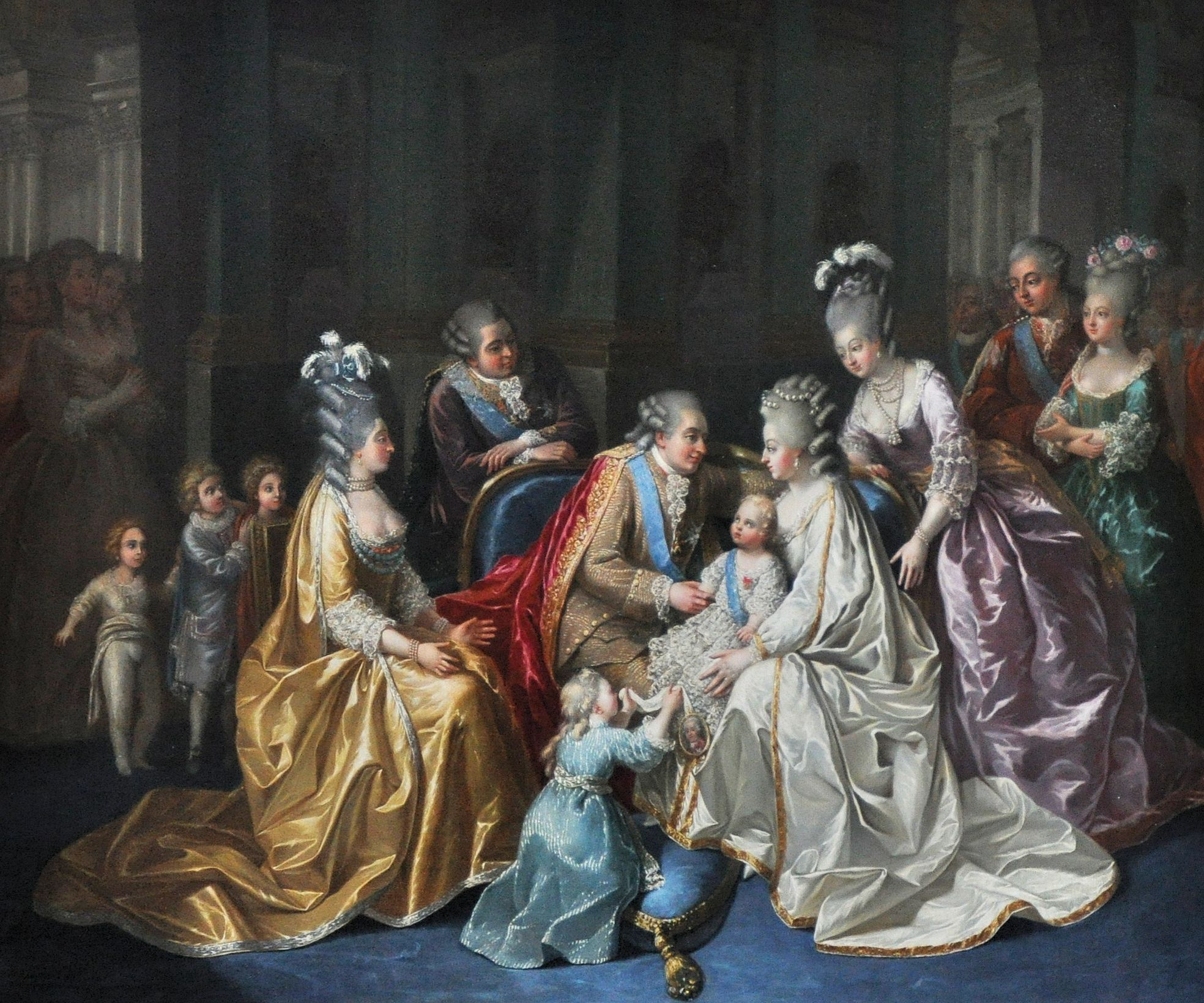
The royal family around the dauphin Anonymous

==== Heater ====
The main service room on the ground floor is the central kitchen, or "grand office", accessible from the vestibule via an intermediate gallery. Two small pantry rooms were attached to it. From 1770 onwards, it became more precisely a warming room, mainly intended to perfect the preparation of dishes made in the common areas. In order not to disturb the occupants of the château, the kitchens were located in a vast wing close to the château, linked to the warming room by a long series of sheltered corridors. Its wide, flat ashlar vault, designed by Gabriel, is considered a masterpiece. There is a large fireplace with a Greek-style hood and a masonry stove used to heat dishes. Marie-Antoinette had it removed because of the odors it gave off and the room was assigned to the "Queen's wives ". In 2008, it was restored on the model of the original room in the Queen's hamlet and copper tables and utensils were installed in the style of the period.

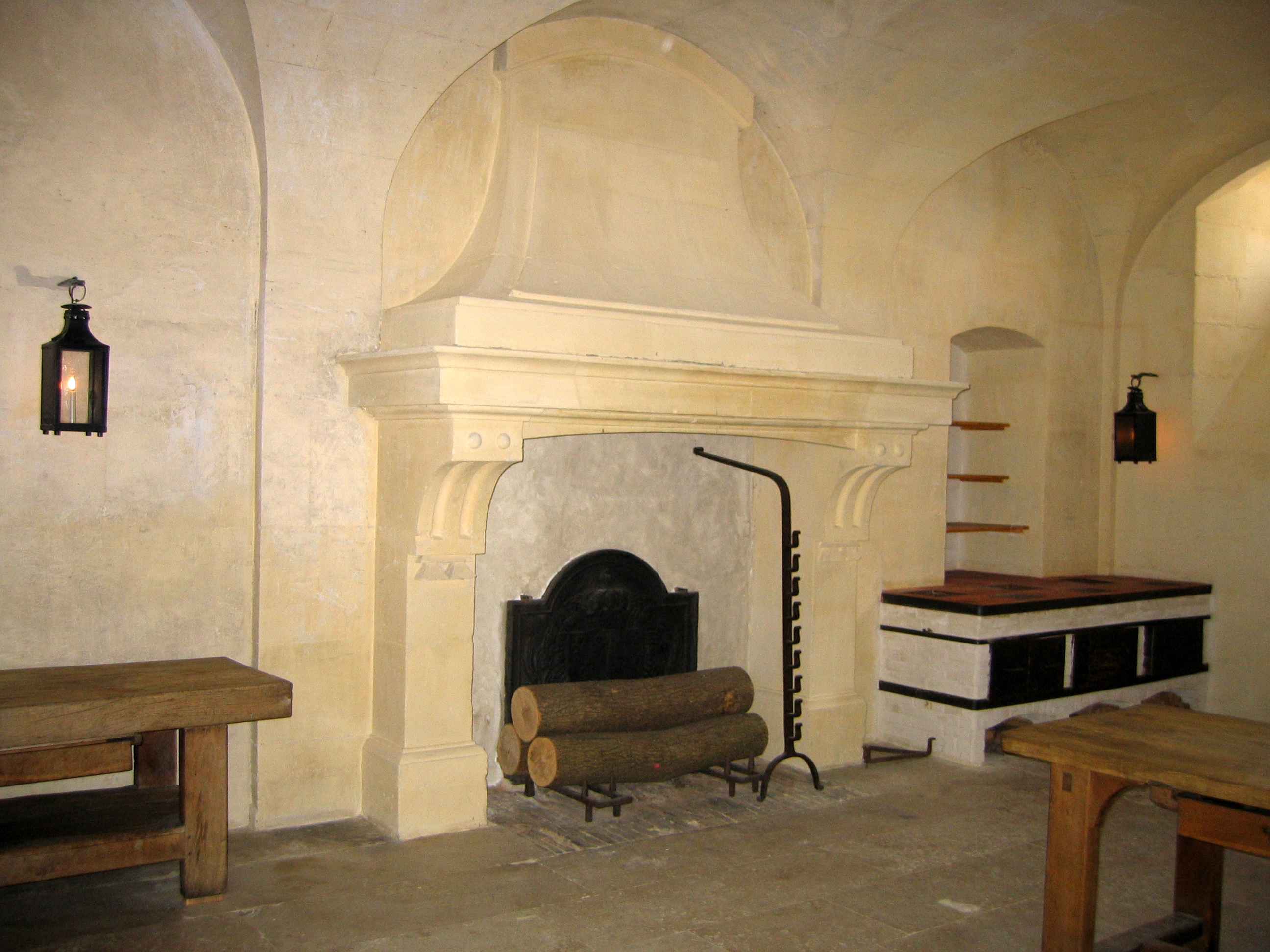
Fireplace

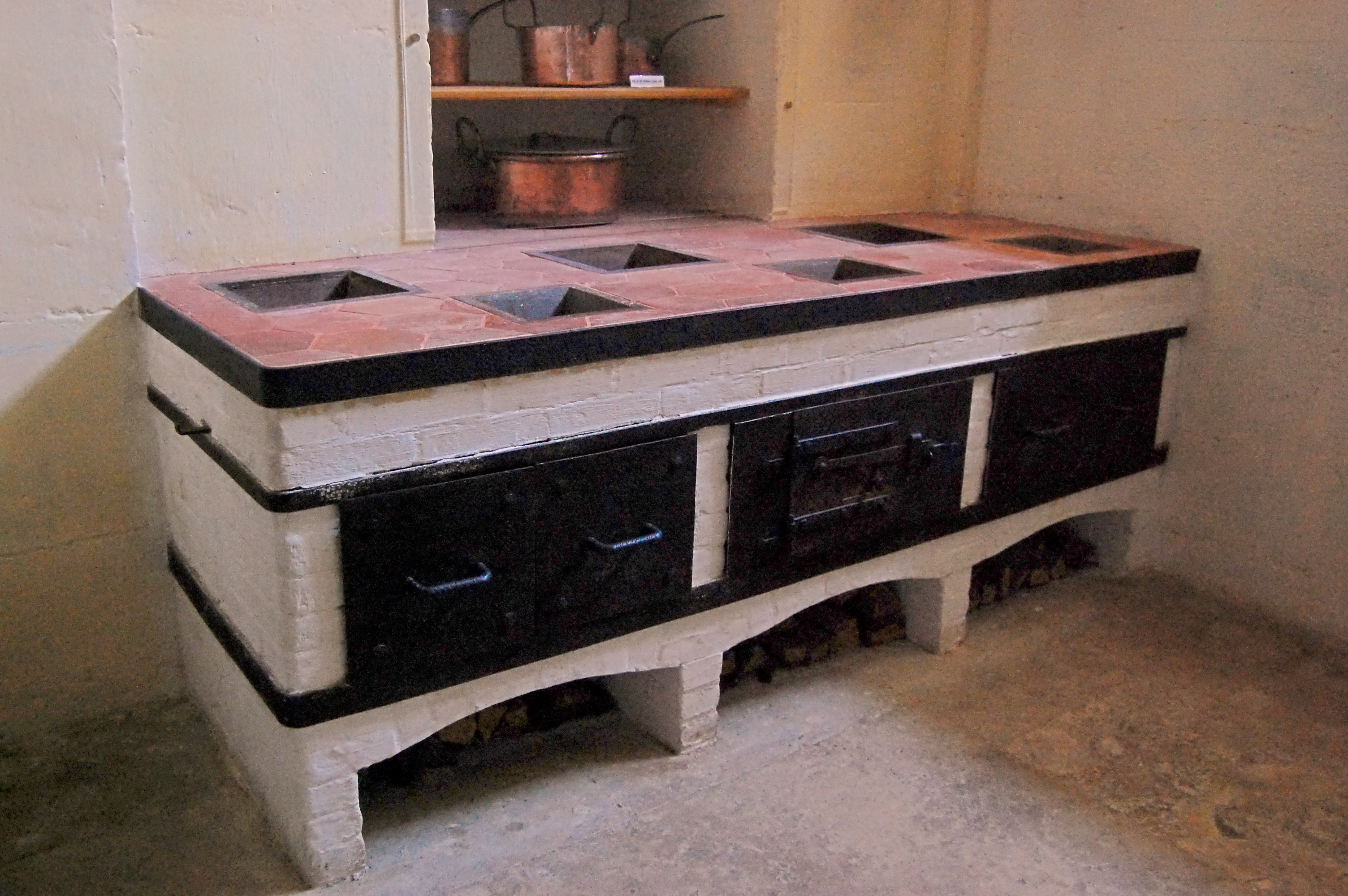
Stove

==== Fruiterie ====
Louis XV wanted to install "flying tables", (Note: The expression "moving table" is also sometimes used.) like those at the Château de Choisy, so that tables previously laid on the lower floor could appear in the center of the first-floor dining room. The inventor, Loriot, designed this mechanism, which allowed one or more tables to be moved up or down, replacing a rose-shaped piece of parquet flooring of the same size. This device had the dual advantage of surprising guests and preserving the privacy of conversations by eliminating the presence of servants and prying eyes. The process was exhibited at the Louvre in May 1769 and the work for Trianon was entrusted to the locksmith Gamain and the mechanic Richer. To enable the installation of the pulleys and counterweights for the two planned tables, two rooms on the ground floor were given over to him, which led to an initial enlargement of the offices in 1770. However, due to the high cost of this mechanism, its installation was canceled, (Note: A similar system installed at Drottningholm Castle still exists, while the one at La Muette disappeared, as has the one at Choisy Castle designed by the engineer Guérin de Montpellier.) on 16 March 1772, by a letter from Marigny to Loriot. (Note: "Circumstances appear, Sir, not to allow long the execution of the two mechanical tables that you have invented for the new Trianon".) Only a few improvements were made, in particular the hopper that can be seen in the ceiling, and its inventor was compensated.

The two small rooms were once again used simply as pantry rooms (Note: According to the minutes of 13 August 1792, the corner room was transformed into a boudoir.) and two storage units from the fruit room were restored according to period plans, as was the fireplace. A narrow staircase gives access to two small cellars, the only ones in the château, where the machinery for operating these "flying tables" would have been installed. In 1782, a gallery was built behind the fruit factory, leading to the ring game.

Multimedia terminals have been installed to provide visitors with information about the Petit Trianon and its construction and recent restoration, as well as a three-dimensional model of the first floor.

==== Silver room ====
The crockery and silverware from the Petit Trianon are kept in this room. Some of it was transferred to the outbuildings when the latter were extended. Large cupboards were used to store items ordered by the Queen. Restored in 2007 according to designs by cabinetmaker André-Jacob Roubo, they now display some items of great value, such as a service "à attributs et groseilles" (with attributes and redcurrants) from Louis XV and one "à perles et barbeaux" (with pearls and barbs) from Marie-Antoinette, (Note: These are blueberries.) as well as many pieces from the 19th century. The first is a porcelain service commissioned in 1763 for various of the King's châteaux, transferred to Trianon in 1769 and completed by 1790. It comes from the Manufacture de Sèvres and is decorated, probably by Charles Buteux, who worked at the Manufacture between 1756 and 1782, with civil or military trophies. The second, of the same provenance, contains 295 pieces (Note: The full list can be found here) and was delivered to the Queen on 2 January 1782 for 12,420 livres. Its decoration, designed by the painter Michel-Gabriel Commelin and produced by Jean-Nicolas Lebel, was very fashionable, consisting of a wide frieze of cornflowers with a row of white pearls, (Note: It is also known as the " Queen's service with pearls and goose-shit borders) in line with the service ordered the previous year for fifteen guests and representing pink and barbel cartels on a white background. The gilding was done by Jean-Pierre Boulanger.

==== Hall of the ice mechanism ====
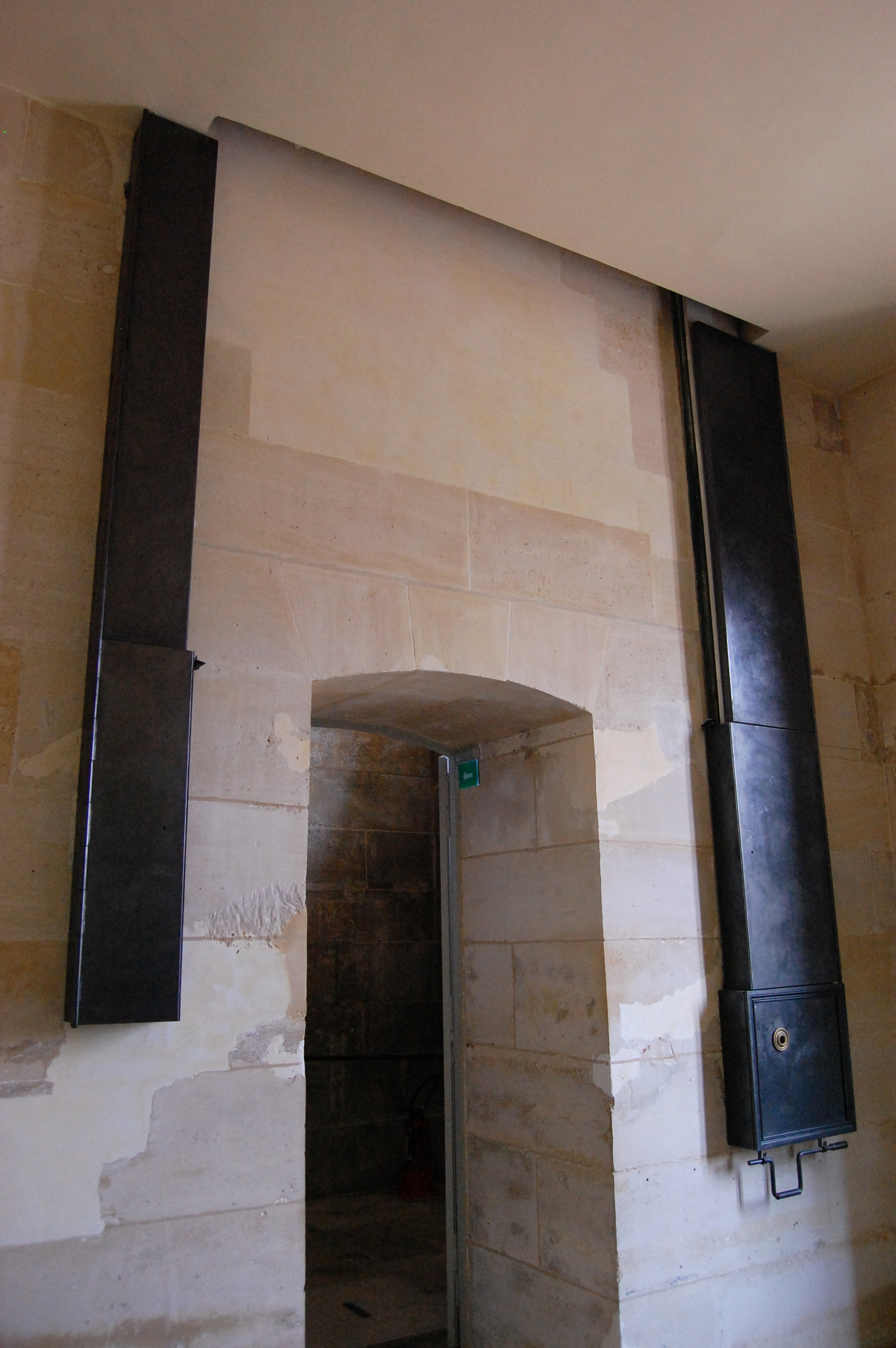
The mechanism of the moving mirrors in the boudoir.

Under Louis XV, the small room to the north-east had a staircase leading to the king's study on the first floor. This was removed in 1776 and the room became a simple storage room; the mechanism for the "moving glass" in the Queen's boudoir, located above, was installed there. The mechanism was built for 24,470 livres by Jean-Tobie Mercklein, royal engineer at the Menus-Plaisirs and designer a few years earlier of the bague game, (Note: He was also responsible for creating a "terrestrial and celestial globe" for Louis XVI in 1786.) and the Crown's master locksmith Jacques-Antoine Courbin. Sold during the Revolution, this almost theatrical pulley system was restored in 1985, made fully operational and even modernized by electrification.

This room also features two display cases showing a set of gardening tools, probably used in Marie-Antoinette's hamlet.

=== First floor ===
Plan of the first floor of the Petit Trianon. A. Grand staircase. B. Anteroom. C. Large dining room. D. Small dining room. E. Company room. F. Boudoir. G. Queen's chamber. H. Bathroom. I. Staircase to the attic. J. Passageway. K. Bathroom. L. Chair wardrobe.

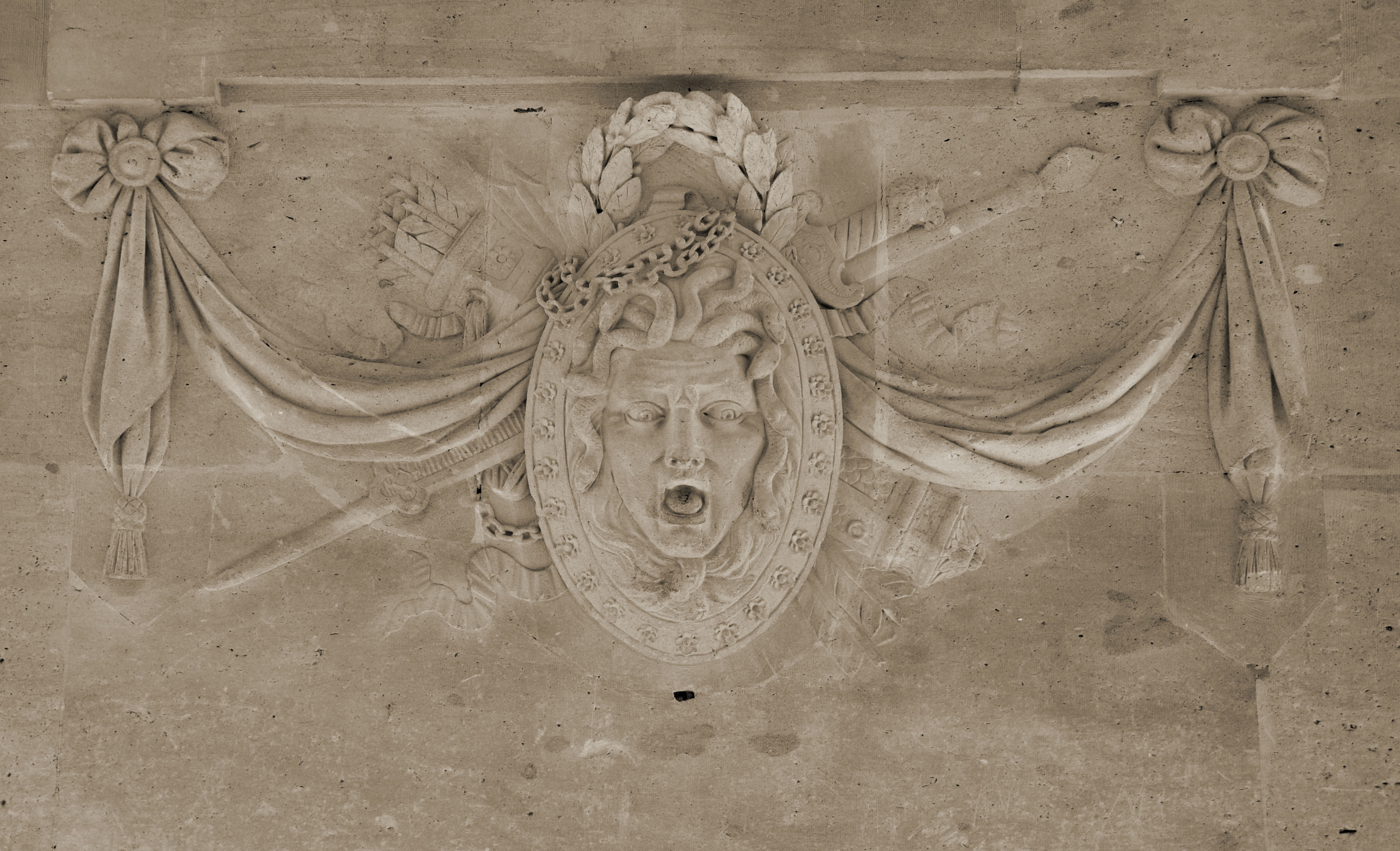
Bas-relief on the first floor landing.

On the first floor landing is a bas-relief, placed between the two windows, depicting a Medusa head "seeming to forbid access to intruders", and completed in 1765 by Honoré Guibert, who executed all the sculptures in the Petit Trianon. Like a courtyard, reinforcing the impression of exterior space, the interior windows overlooking both the small service flats and the mezzanine floor are integrated into a genuine façade in the same fine limestone as the building, with forged balustrades and bull's-eyes framed by oak leaf festoons carved into the stone. The central French window, opening onto the stairwell, is arched and also has a forged balustrade. On the two side walls, laurel wreaths hang from panels known as "tables", which are recessed and surmounted by a neoclassical entablature. The four doors are embellished with spandrels.

The door on the left of the main staircase leads to the mezzanine and attic floors; the door on the right leads to the anteroom of the reception rooms and more intimate rooms. The entire floor is covered in Versailles parquet. The antechamber and dining rooms open directly onto the French garden via four large French windows facing west. Most of the windows on the first floor, originally made of small panes, were transformed under Marie-Antoinette into large mirrored windows opening onto the gardens, to increase the brightness of the rooms but also to allow a better view of the outside world.

==== Antichambre ====
The antechamber is soberly decorated. The walls were paneled throughout and painted in water green with white highlights. On 22 March 1768, Louis XV commissioned Jacques-Philippe Caresme to paint two pictures (Note: 4 feet 9 inches wide by 4 feet 5 inches high.) to decorate the door-tops, inspired by Ovid's Metamorphoses, on the instructions of the secretary of the Royal Academy, Charles-Nicolas Cochin, who "wanted the subject to fit in with the flowers". The first, Myrrha metamorphosed into a shrub, represents Myrrha, the future mother of Adonis, changed into a myrrh tree to escape her incestuous father Theias, King of Syri. (Note: Cinyras, king of Cyprus, is also sometimes mentioned.) The second, which disappeared during the French Revolution, is a representation of Nymph metamorphosed into mint. Proserpine, irritated at having caught Pluto with the daughter of Cocyte, changes her into mint and her brother into wild balm for having encouraged his sister's love.

The antechamber is sometimes called the "buffet room" or the "stove room". In fact, from the outset, two large earthenware stoves were placed on either side of the door leading to the dining room, which also helped to heat without spoiling the luxurious decoration of this reception area. Dismantled during the Revolution, they were replaced in 1805 by two new heating units with plain mosaics by the stove and smoke maker Joseph-Marie Trabuchi. (Note: The Trabuchi brothers were originally from Piedmont, and during the Consulate established themselves as stove and smoke makers and merchants of artistic terracotta.) They were then replaced by two false doors clad in mirrors, which were restored in the 20th century. Between these two periods, Louis-Philippe had sculpted panels from the Salon Frais installed in their place.

Two seventy-centimeter marble busts by Louis-Simon Boizot, commissioned by Marie-Antoinette in 1777 on the occasion of her brother's visit, are set on painted and gilded carved oak sheaths on either side of the French doors opening onto the French Garden, and represent Joseph II of the Holy Empire and Louis XVI, both wearing the Order of the Golden Fleece and the King, the cordon of the Order of the Holy Spirit.

One of the best-known paintings of Marie-Antoinette is on display in the anteroom. This oil on canvas by Élisabeth Vigée Le Brun, the Queen's official painter despite the cabal led by Adélaïde Labille-Guiard, is known as Marie-Antoinette à la rose. Created in 1783, it is one of five replicas of the official portrait of 1778 painted by the artist herself; in the first, which caused a scandal at the time, the Queen poses in a gaulle dress and straw hat, (Note: The original has disappeared.) prefiguring her taste for the hamlet that was being built nearby.

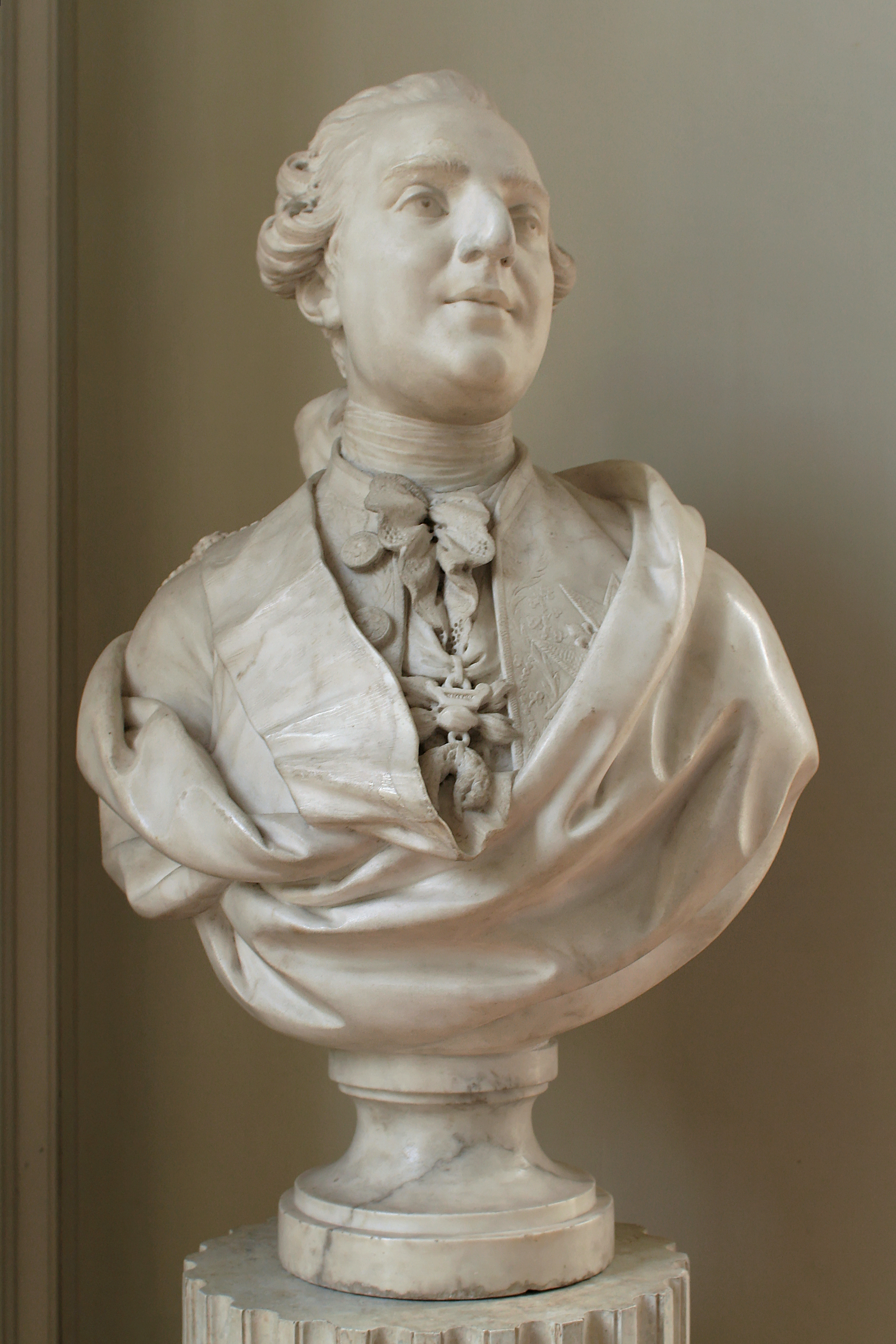
Bust of Louis XVI Louis Boizot

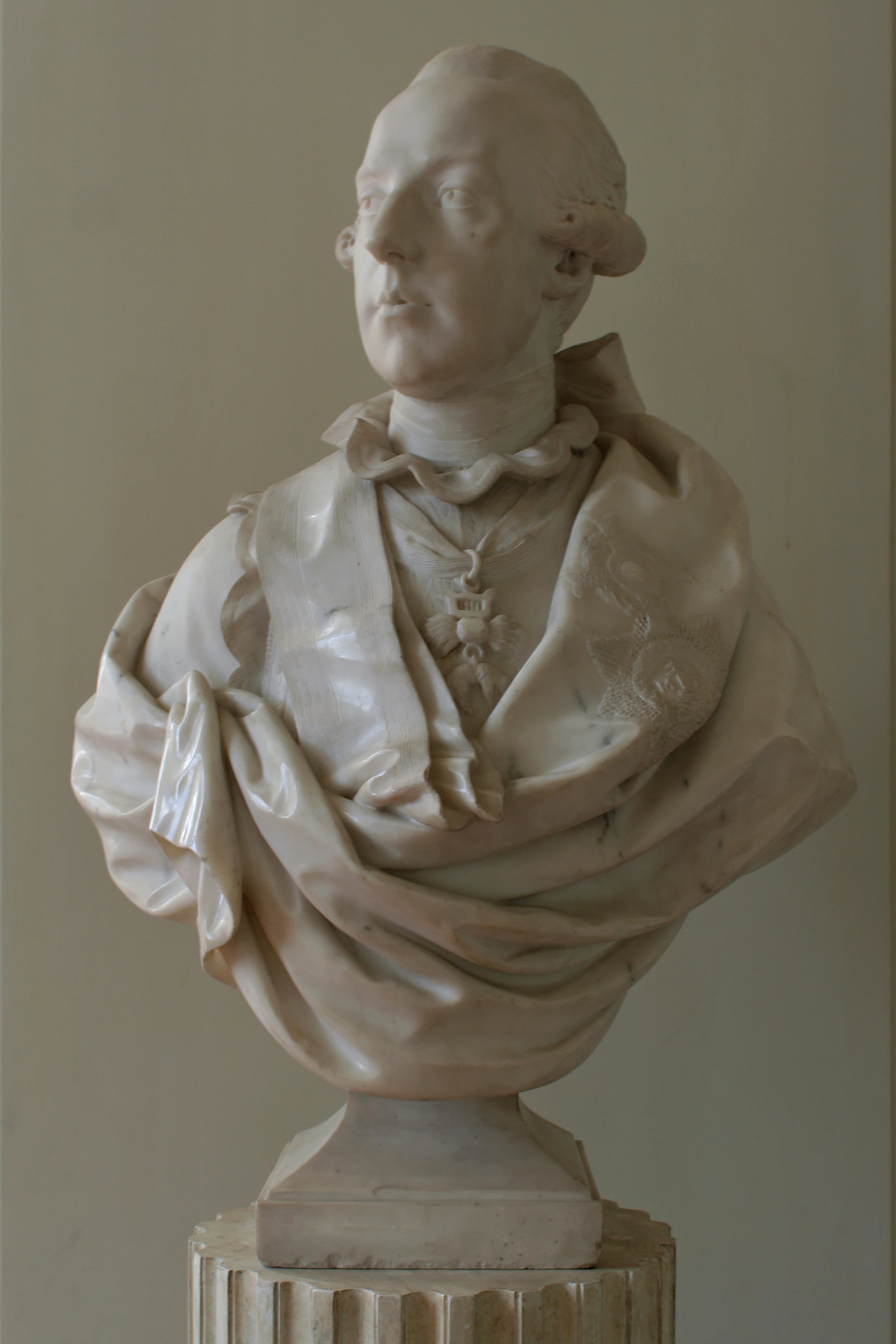
Bust of Joseph II Louis Boizot

==== Large dining room ====
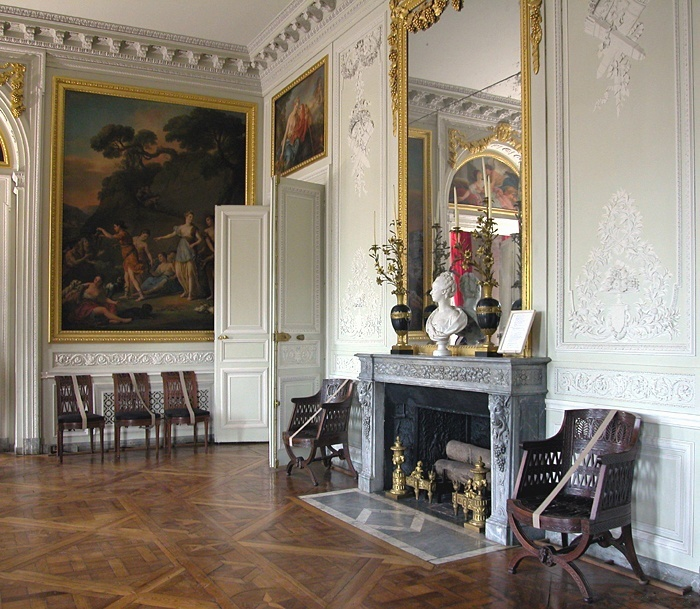
Grand dining room of the Petit Trianon.

The antechamber opens onto the large dining room, a veritable laboratory for tasting the fruit and vegetables grown on the estate. Its décor is entirely devoted to nature, in keeping with Louis XV's desire for harmony between the interior of the château and its gardens. As in the two adjoining rooms, the lower part of the paneling, richly sculpted by Honoré Guibert, depicts interlacing fruit. On the high panels, torches and quivers hang from wreaths of flowers. The turquoise blue marble mantel, by Jacques-François Dropsy, features trophies and garlands of flowers and fruit. It is surmounted by a mirror adorned with vine branches held by a Bacchic mascaron.

The subjects of the overdoors, ordered at the same time as those of the antechamber, were chosen in the same spirit: Vertumne and Pomona, Venus and Adonis, Borée and Orythie and Zéphir and Flore. The first two, rectangular, were executed by Clément Belle, the others, curved, by Charles Monnet, painters less prominent than those hired for the large compositions, but both working under the direction of Charles-Nicolas Cochin.

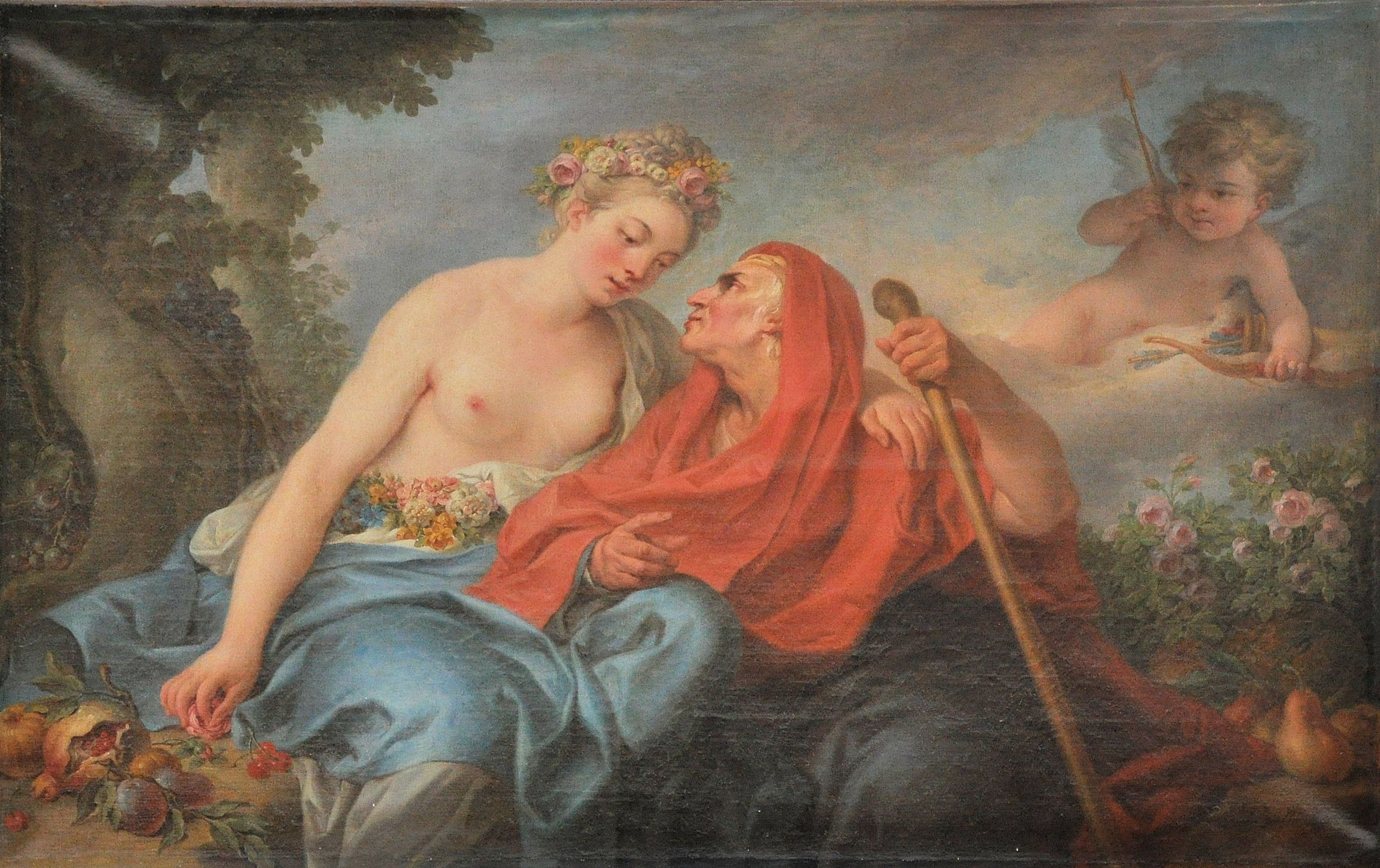
Vertumne and Pomona Clément Belle

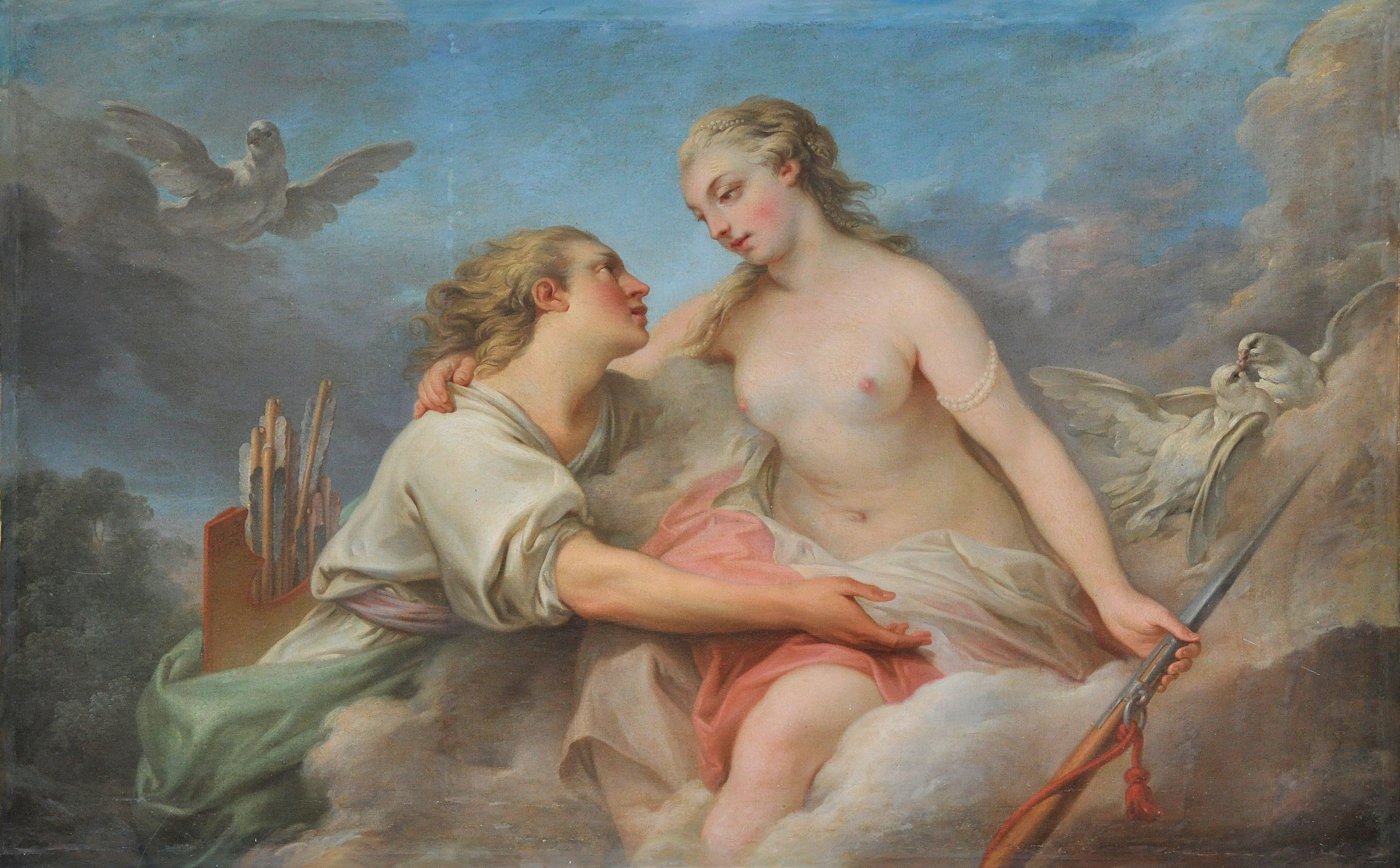
Venus and Adonis. Clément Belle

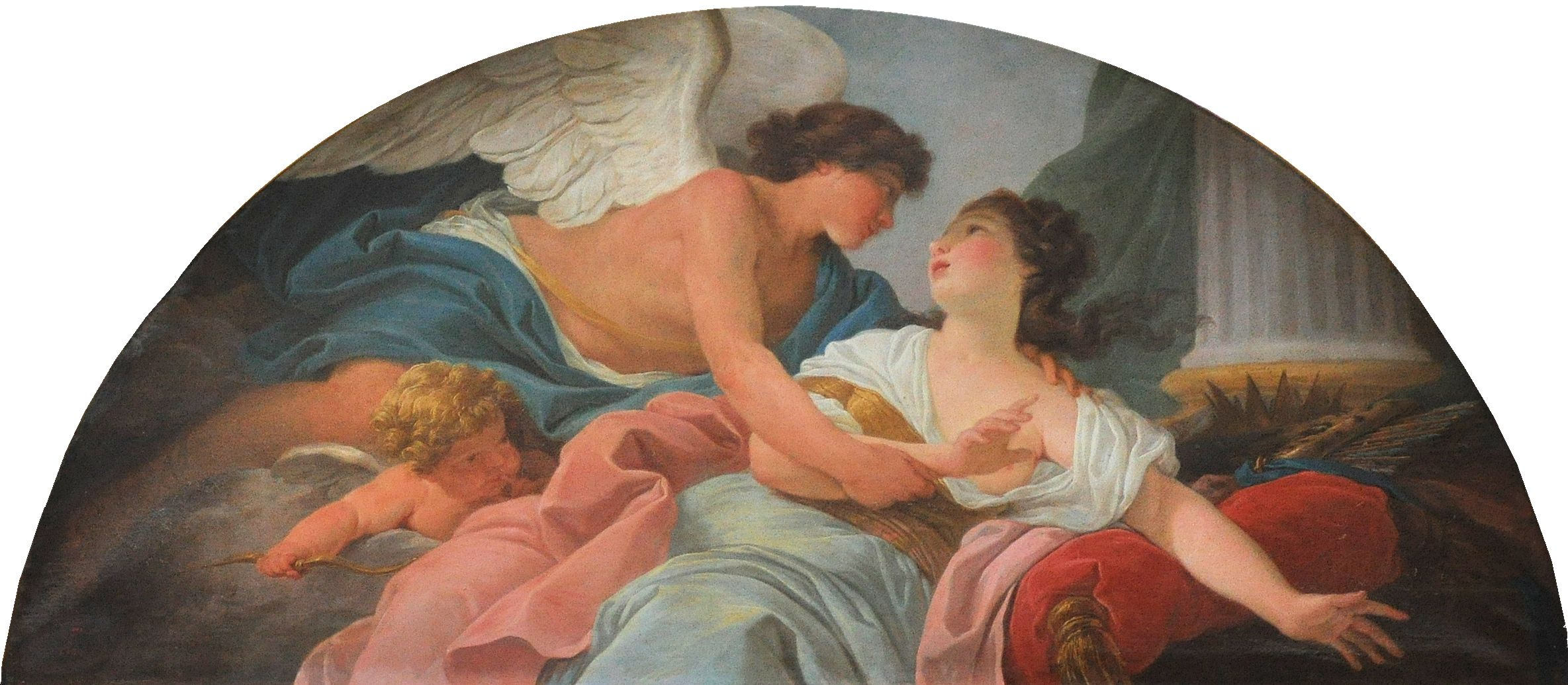
Borée and Orythie. Clément Belle

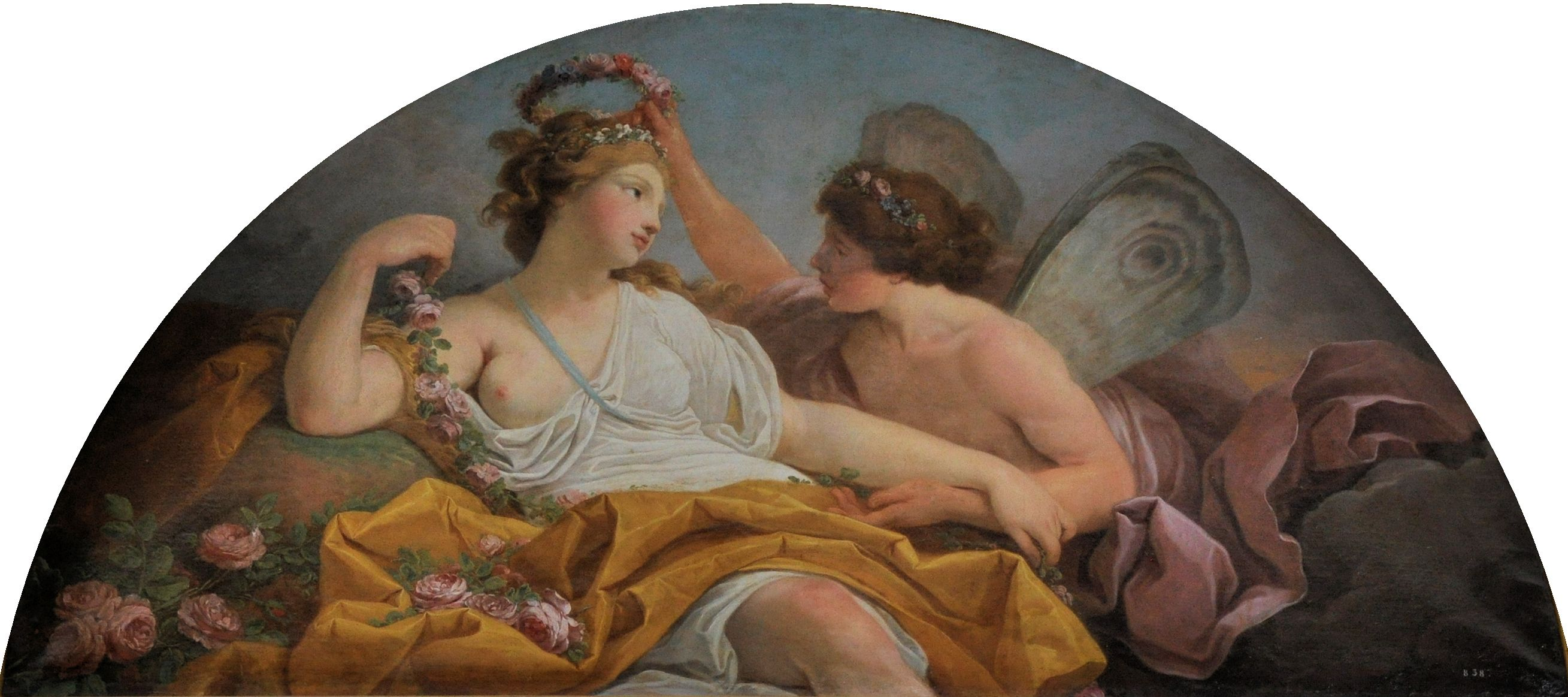
Zéphir and Flore. Clément Belle

On the side walls, each arcade with a doorway is framed by two large canvases depicting allegorical scenes around food. Moisson was painted in 1769 by Lagrenée and shows Ceres and King Triptolème teaching how to grow wheat. Chasse was commissioned from Vien, director of the Académie de Rome, and in 1773 depicted Diana and her nymphs ordering the shepherds to share the fruits of their hunt. When Louis XV died, the last two paintings had not been completed, causing confusion among contemporary painters. La Pêche features Doyen, (Note: The commission was actually placed in 1768 with Pierre, who is said to have given it to Hallé, himself having exchanged his fishing subject for Doyen's harvest.) Neptune and Amphitrite, accompanied by a procession of nymphs and tritons, offering men the riches of the sea. Finally, the fourth painting, by Hallé, depicting La Vendange and the triumph of Bacchus with the peasants cultivating the grapes, was criticized and replaced for a while by a work by Pierre on the same theme.

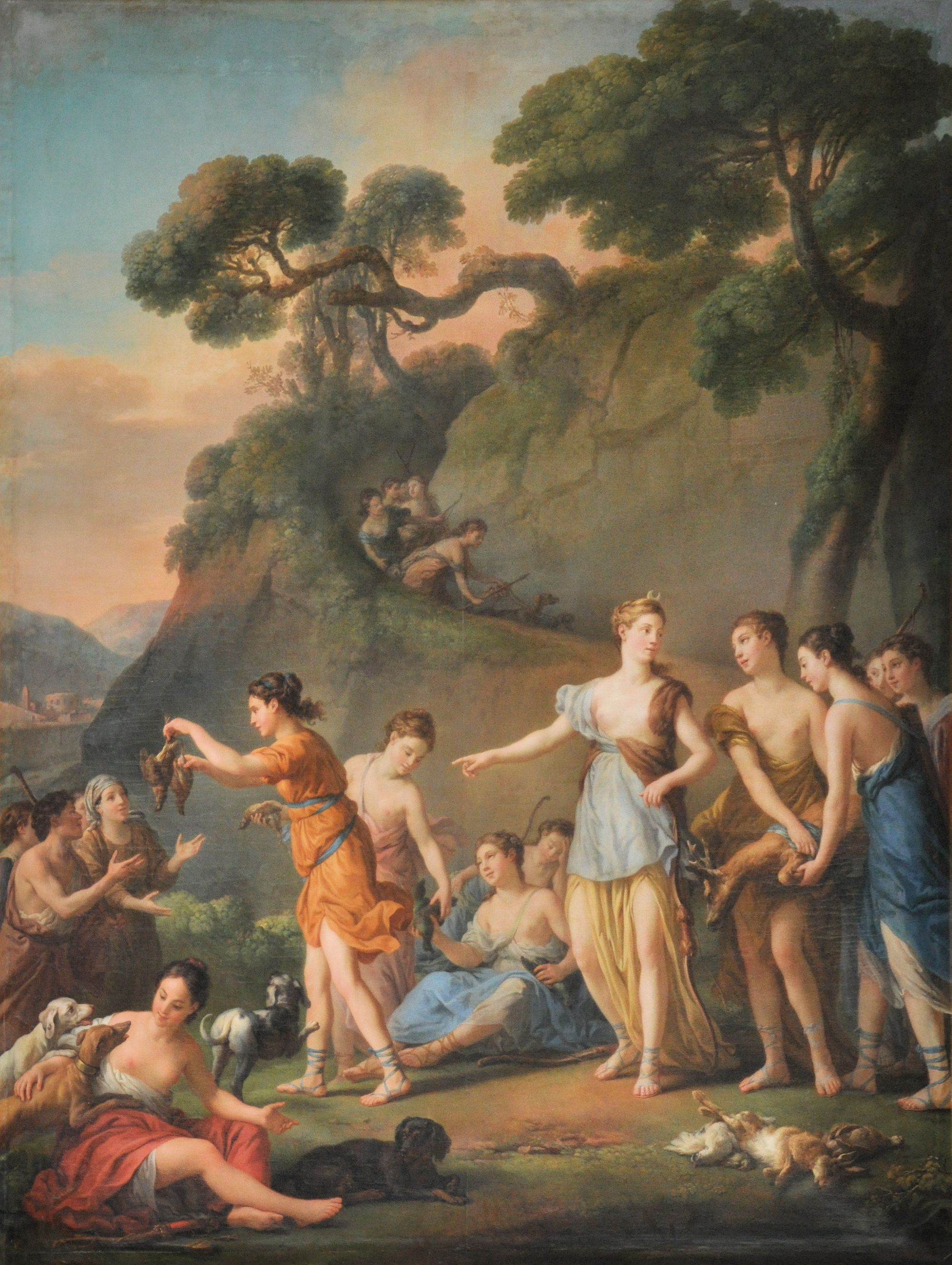
The Vien hunt

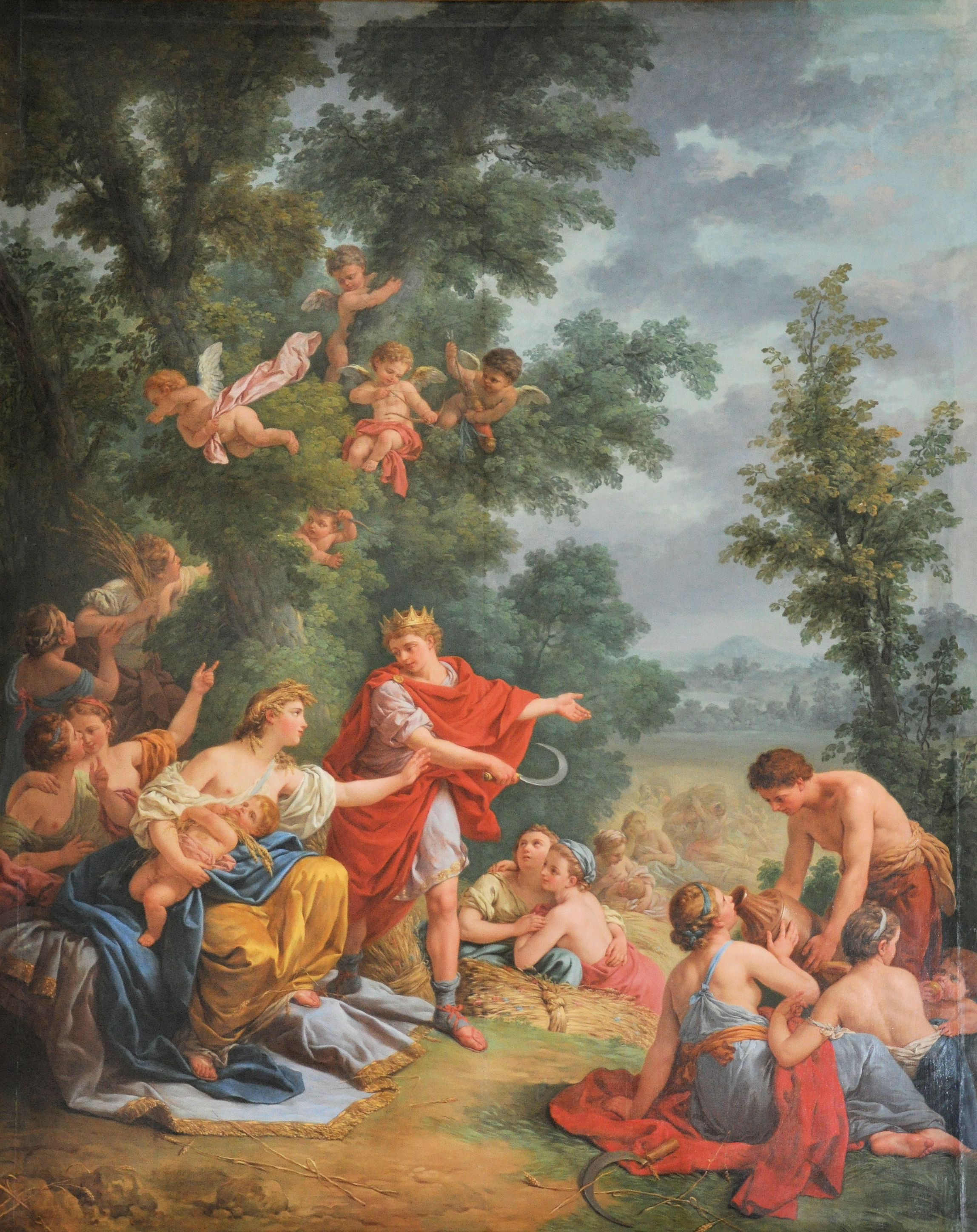
La Moisson Lagrenée

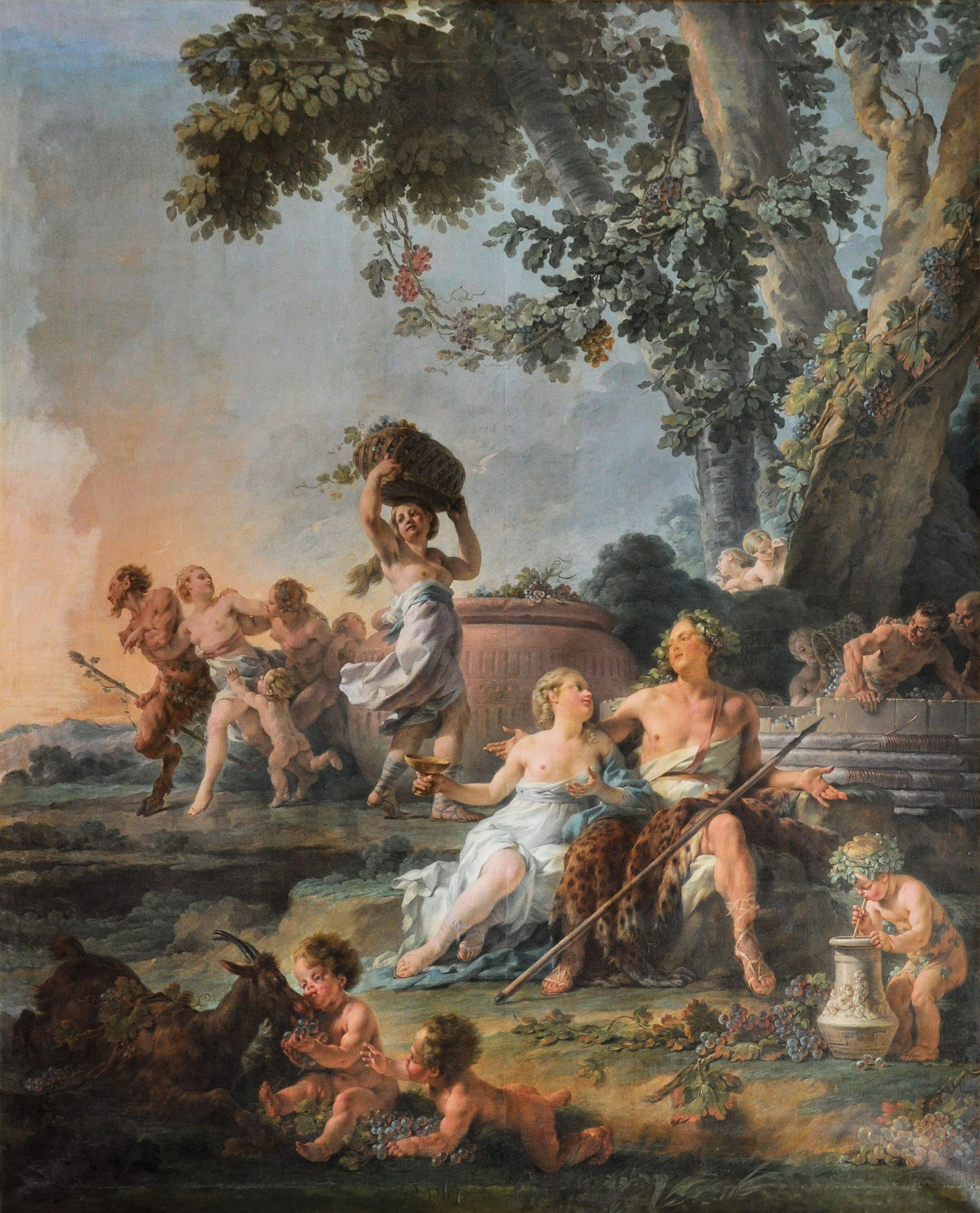
Hallé Harvest

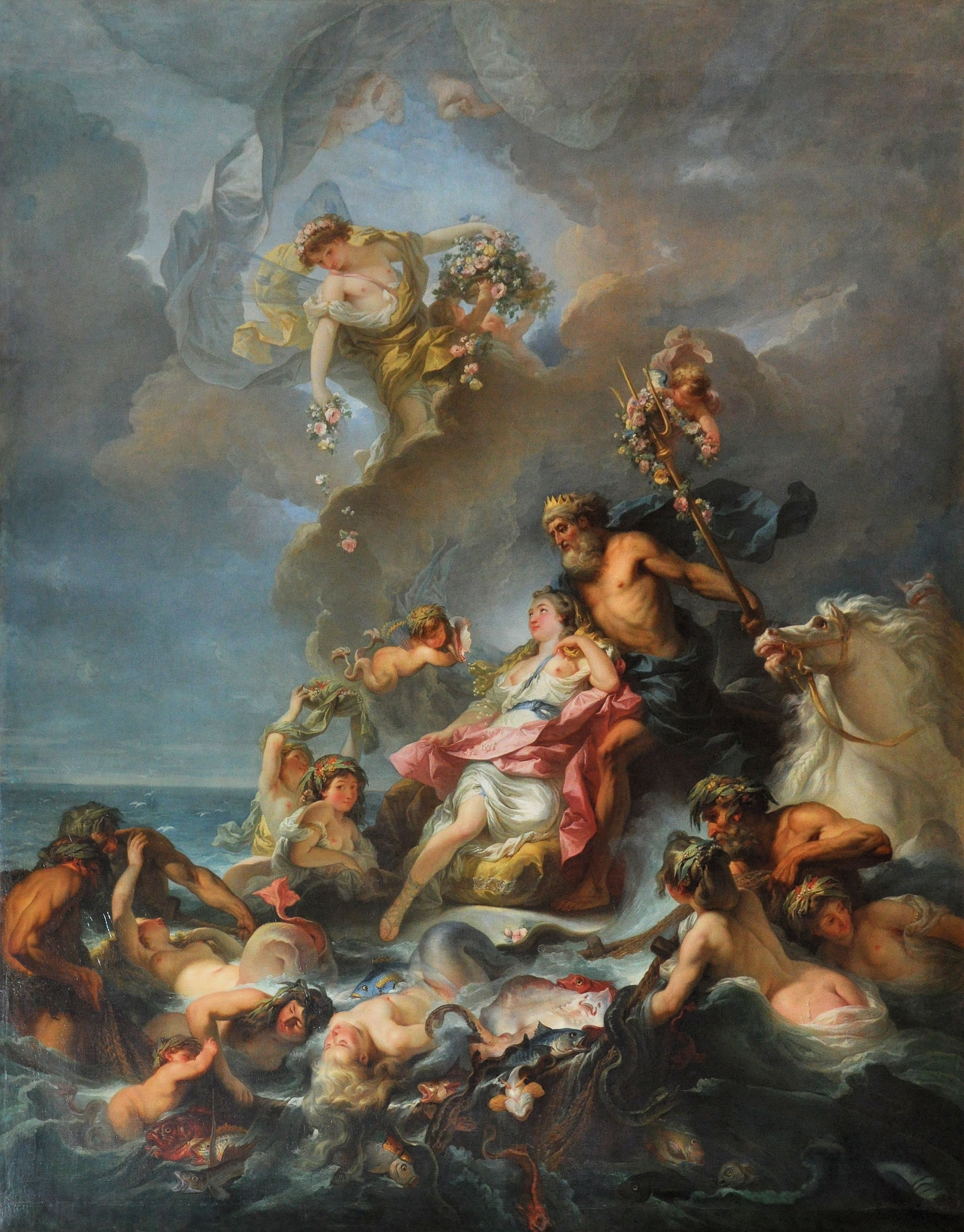
La Pêche Doyen

King Louis XV dined for the first time in this dining room in September 1769, on a crimson Genoa damask armchair surrounded by around twenty chairs. After taking possession of the estate, Marie-Antoinette wanted to remove the last two paintings, as she did not appreciate the nudes. To mark the occasion, she asked her mother Marie-Thérèse for two reproductions of paintings depicting her and her brothers and sisters at the wedding of Joseph II. However, she was unable to force the change of these canvases, which risked disrupting the iconographic harmony developed by Cochin, and those by Weikert were exhibited on the ground floor, in the billiard room. The royal couple's last dinner was held on 24 July 1788.

The four paintings, lost during the French Revolution, were replaced in 1805 by tempera canvases by Pierre Drahonet, depicting ruined architecture; they were removed during the Restoration and in 1819 Louis XVIII commissioned François-Louis Dejuinne to produce four canvases on the theme of the seasons, but with the original allegories: Spring (Flora and Zephyrus), Summer (Ceres and Triptoleme), Autumn (Bacchus and Silenus) and Winter (Boreas kidnaps Orythia). Completed in 1825, after the death of the King, they were not installed until the reign of Louis-Philippe and remained in place until the end of the 19th century, giving the room the name "Salon des saisons" or "Salle à manger aux saisons".

Traces of a trapdoor remain in the centre of the Versailles parquet floor, a vestige of the old "flying tables" project, which envisaged sending them from the lower floor, already set up.

==== Small dining room ====
The adjoining small dining room was also intended to house one of the "flying tables" from Loriot's abandoned project. Under Louis XV, it was used for tête à tête meals and galant suppers. Its decoration takes up the theme of nature and the panels are sculpted with baskets and plant ornaments, as in the antechamber, but only in the upper part of the paneling.

In 1768, the painter Jean-François Amand was commissioned to paint a three-part episode of the Legend of Love on the door tops, but he died a few months later before completing his work. Antoine Renou commissioned Les Amours et les Grâces, but the paintings disappeared during the French Revolution. During the reign of Louis-Philippe I, three pastorales by Jean-Baptiste Pater produced in the 1720s were installed: Bain Concert champêtre and Pêche, which for a long time were mistakenly attributed to Watteau. (Note: While the painting of the Bath is by Pater, its composition is by Watteau.)

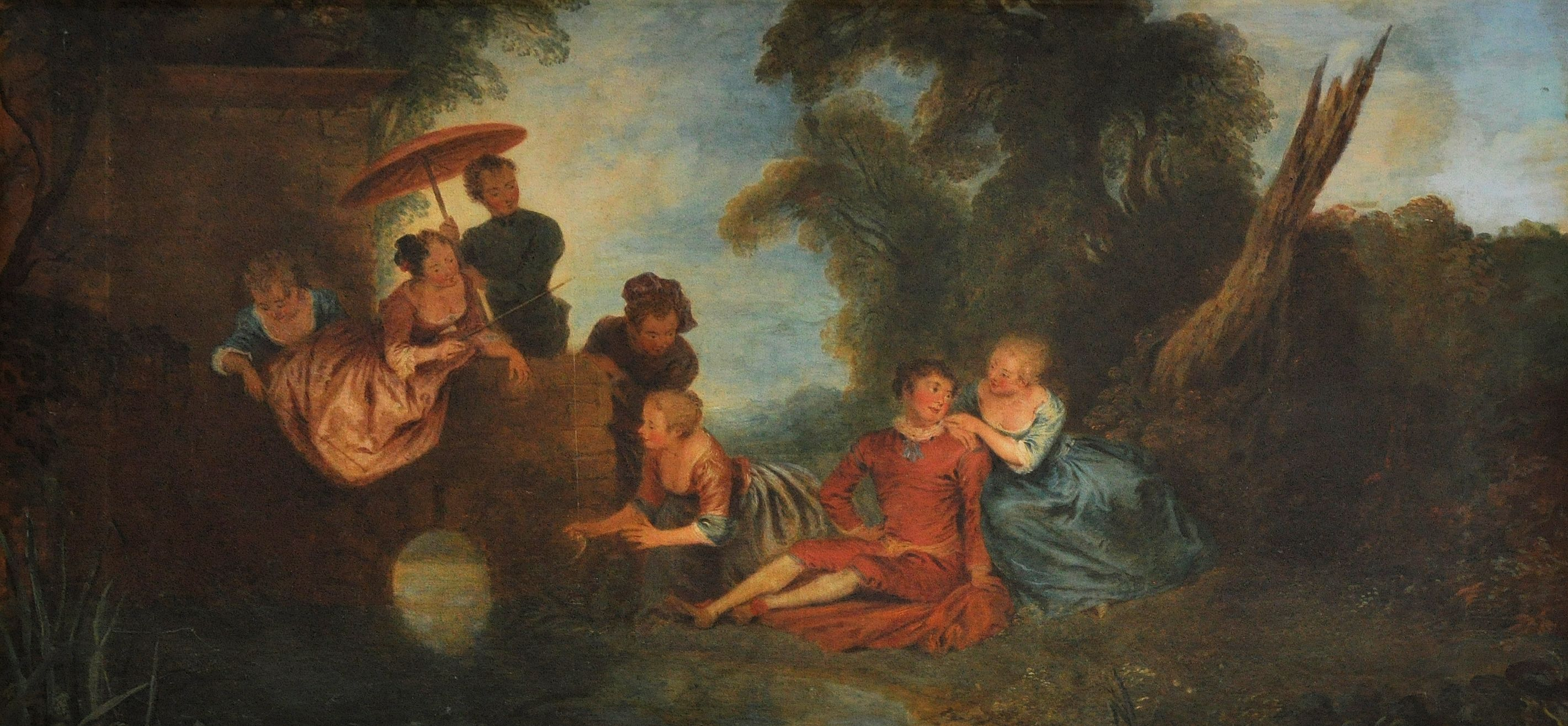
Fishing Jean-Baptiste Pater, circa 1720

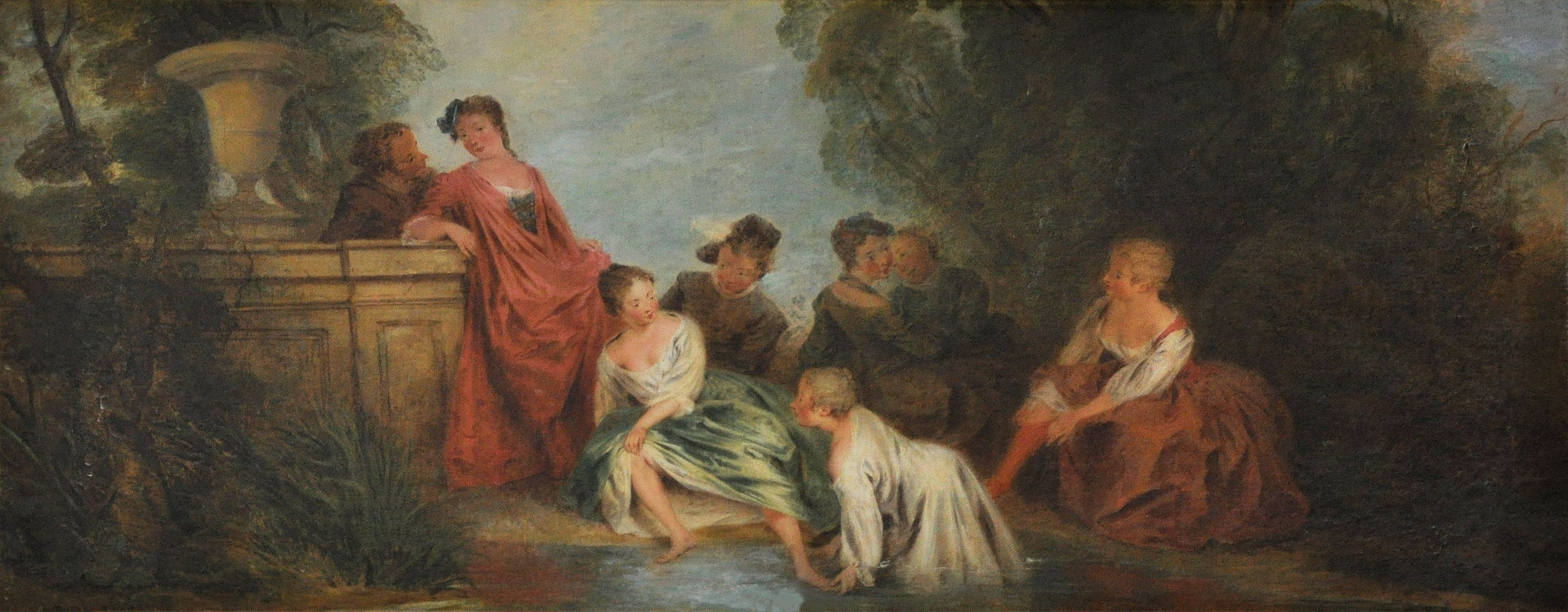
The Jean-Baptiste Pater Bath, circa 1720

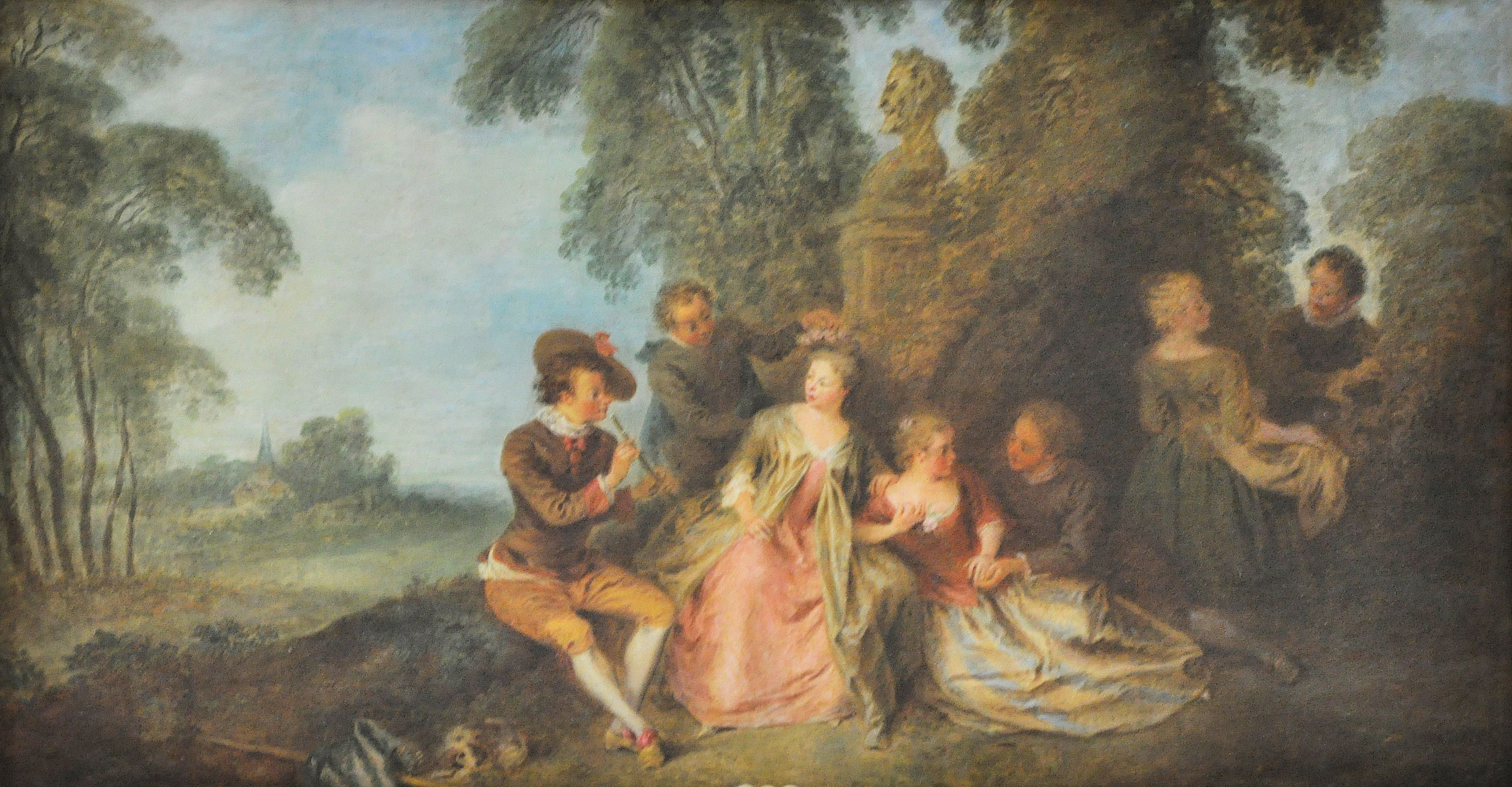
The Country Concert by Jean-Baptiste Pater, circa 1720

The dining room was furnished with nineteen chairs, including a higher one for the King. As the fireplace had not been ordered in 1766, the sculptor Jacques-François Dropsy supplied one from his workshops in Italief 6 cherry. In 1784, Marie-Antoinette transformed the small dining room into a billiard room and installed the billiard table on the ground floor in this room. This use was retained in the 19th century: a new billiard table, of imposing dimensions, made in 1830 by Cosson, (Note: This billiard table is currently on display at the Grand Trianon, in the Salon de musique) was installed in April 1836 when the Duchess of Orléans moved in. The Empire seats were upholstered in green cannetillé. The widow Morillon's hair stand, a pedestal table, a quadrille table, and a console table complete the furniture.

A portrait of the Marquise de Pompadour by Carle van Loo, known as the Belle Jardinière, is displayed on one of the panels.

==== Company lounge ====
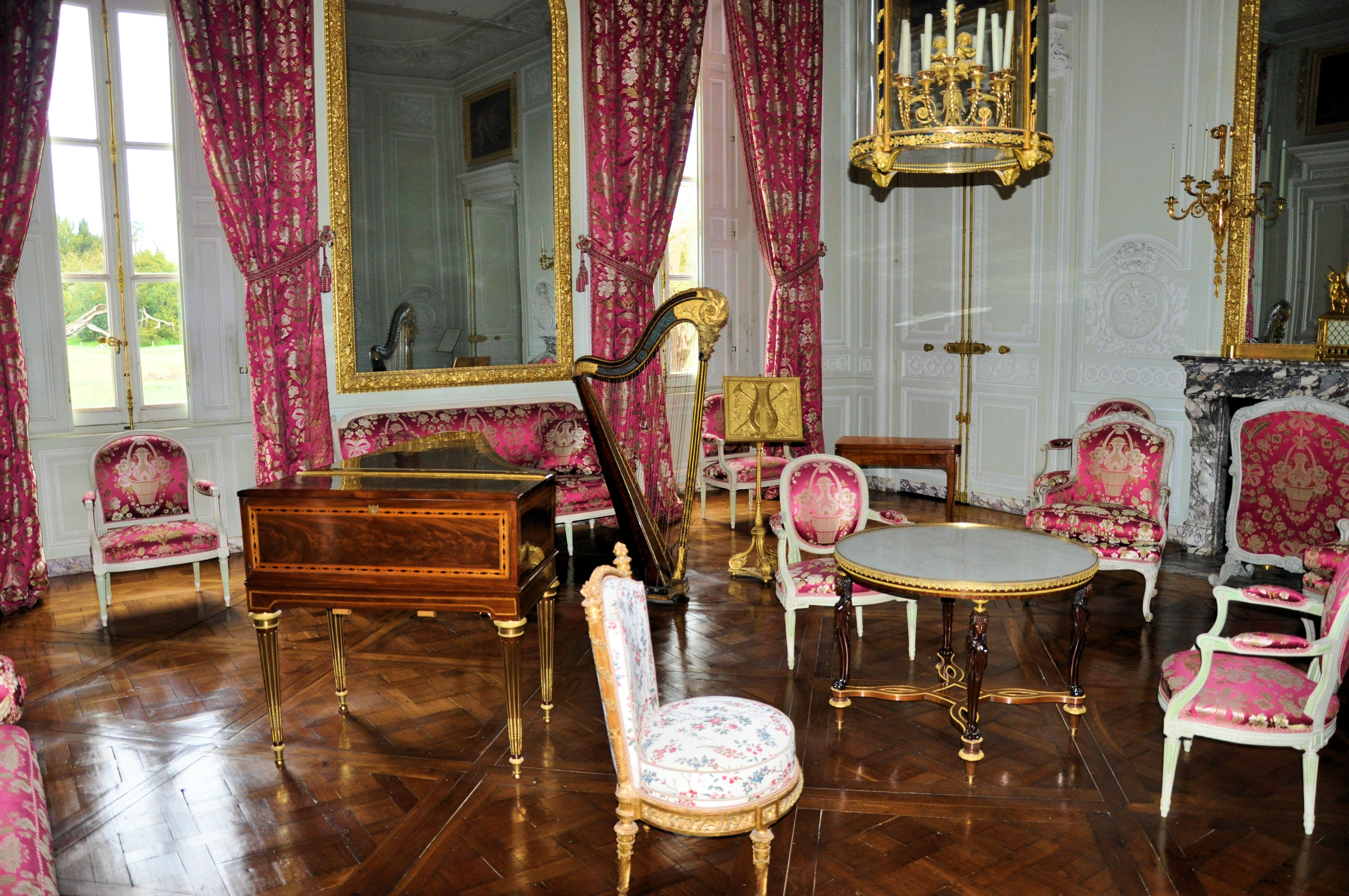
Le Salon de compagnie.

The drawing room is the main room in what is known as "the Queen's flats". It can be accessed directly from the Grand Staircase via a small corridor. It was originally Madame de Pompadour's reception room. It is sometimes also called the "Grand Salon".

The upper part of the wall panels features the traditional shell, the rest being given over to a refined decoration evoking nature, with chains of flowers and fruit sculpted by Guibert. The two "Ls" in Louis XV's cipher are a perfect illustration of the floral spirit, formed by leaves entwining three fleur-de-lis au naturel beneath a crown of flowers. The bases are finely crafted by the joiners Jean-Antoine Guesnon (Note: He also designed the main door of the Chapelle Royale.) and Clicot, with lily branches mixed with rose wreaths against a background of sunflowers.

The lantern, commissioned by Marie-Antoinette in 1784 to replace Louis XV's old chandelier, was made by Pierre-Philippe Thomire, in lapis blue enamel, glass, and chased bronze enhanced by two-tone golds representing the bows and quivers of disarmed Love. After being dismantled during the revolutionary sales, the "Trianon lantern" was installed on the grand staircase in 1867, before being returned to its original position during the 2008 restoration.

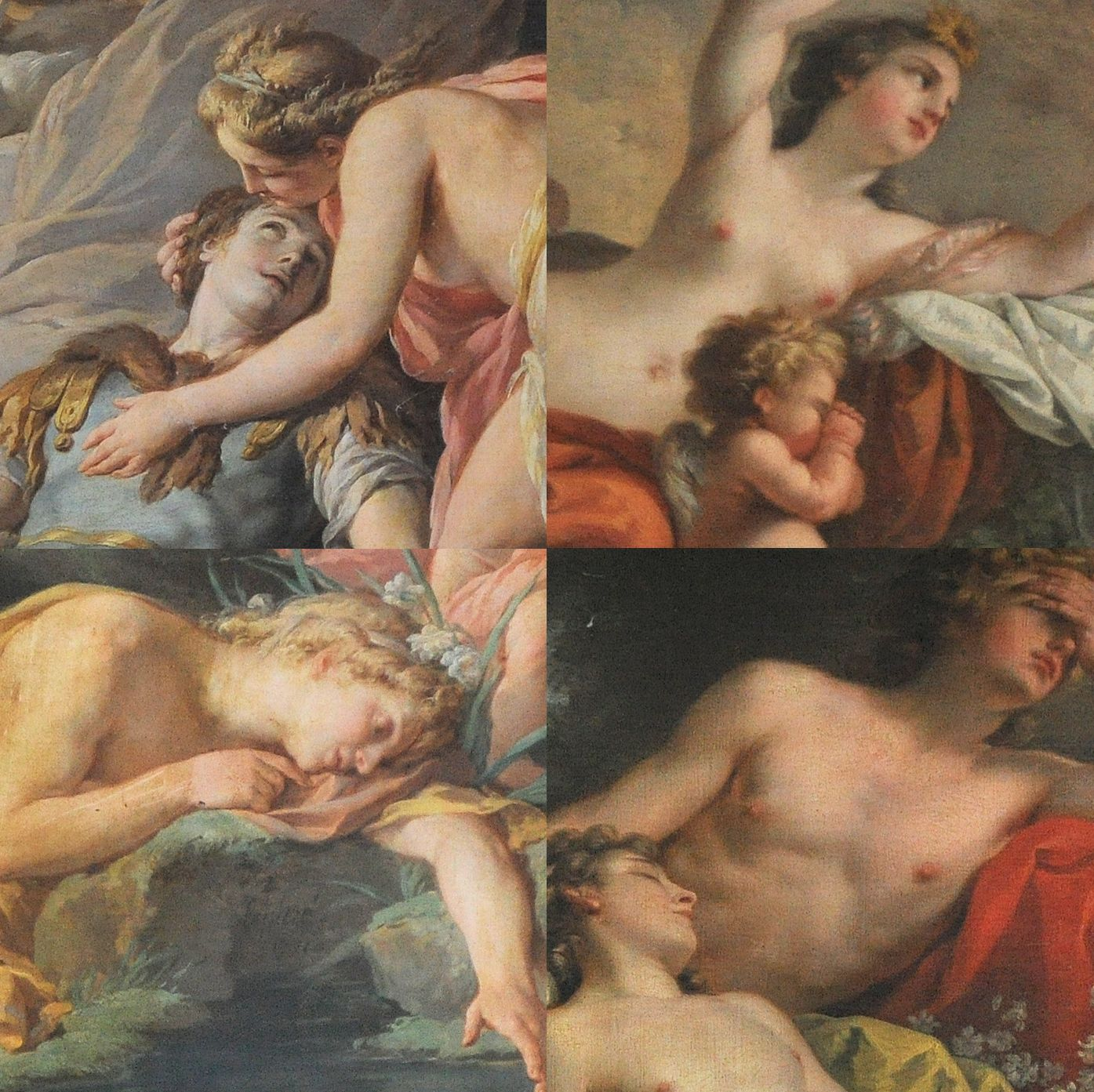
Detail of four paintings representing the Metamorphoses, by Nicolas-René Jollain and Nicolas-Bernard Lépicié.

As in the reception rooms, the doors were topped with canvases commissioned in 1768 from the series inspired by Ovidec's Metamorphoses. Nicolas-René Jollain painted the allegories of Clytie changed into a sunflower and Hyacinthe changed into a flower. Lépicié was entrusted with the other two overdoors: Adonis changed into an anemone, (Note: Presented in 1769, it was probably revived by the author in 1782, the date inscribed on the work.) and Narcisse changed into a flower.

Marie-Antoinette transformed the room into a music salon where she enjoyed meeting her circle of intimates. The pianoforte was made in 1790 by Pascal-Joseph Taskin, in oak and mahogany frames with ebony and lemon tree inlays. (Note: This copy was placed in the Petit Trianon in 1867, as was the carved and gilded beech music stand from the Hôtel Kinsky.) The harp was made by the Queen's luthier, Nadermann. It was made around 1780 for another client and is comparable in its construction to the one on which Marie-Antoinette played with a talent inherited from her Viennese training. (Note: See the photograph of the harp that belonged to Marie-Antoinette in the Paris Conservatoire museum.) The Queen's taste for instruments such as the harp, harpsichord, and pianoforte, which were often played by women, encouraged the spread of this music, which was performed both in intimate society settings and on concert stages. Gautier-Dagoty produced a gouache depicting the Queen playing the harp.

" Despite the pleasures of Carnival, I am always faithful to my harp, and people think that I am making progress on it". - Marie-Antoinette to Empress Marie-Thérèse, 13 January 1773, in Lettres de Marie-Antoinette, chap. XVIII

The furniture delivered in 1769 for Madame du Barry included a sofa, six armchairs, nineteen chairs, a fireplace screen, and a folding screen. Made by Nicolas-Quinibert Foliot, Pierre-Edme Babel, and the widow Bardou, it is covered in blue pekin painted with flowers65. It was dispersed during the Revolution. During the re-furnishing of the Empire, seats with quiver legs were installed. After unsuccessful attempts by Vivant Denon, Director General of Museums, to reassemble the original paintings, two pictures were installed on the panelling of the company lounge: Alexandre malade et son médecin Philippe by Jean Restout, and Le Jeune Pyrrhus à la cour du roi Glaucias by Hyacinthe Collin de Vermont.

In May 1837, Alphonse Jacob-Desmalter supplied a large round "family" table with claw feet; too imposing, it was ill-suited to the refinement of the salon. (Note: This table is currently on display at the Grand Trianon, in Louis-Philippe's Salon de famille.) The current Lyon damask seats and curtains in three predominantly cherry colors are a recreation of the textile splendor found in the royal flats of the 18th century. The canvases over the doors have been returned to their original position.

==== Boudoir ====
This small room in the northeast corner of the château was originally intended solely as a passageway between the ground floor and the King's private flats on the mezzanine or attic floors. It was certainly the "King's coffee room". The staircase is semicircular and occupies a large half of the space. There is a large sofa by Tours (Note: Fine cross-ribbed fabric.) and a built-in table by Riesener. Coffee was fashionable at the court of Versailles; the King himself roasted the few pounds harvested in his experimental garden at Trianon and prepared his favorite drink in person, which he shared with his family, gazing at the greenhouses of his botanical garden.

In 1776, Marie-Antoinette had the room converted into a boudoir. The staircase was removed and an ingenious mechanism was installed to close the two windows in this room with large mirrors rising from the floor. The room was directly accessible from the east staircase overlooking Louis XV's flower garden, the future Anglo-Chinese garden. The mechanics were installed on the lower floor under the direction of the Menus-Plaisirs engineer, Jean-Tobie Mercklein. From then on, this boudoir was known as the "Cabinet des glaces mouvantes", where the Queen sought privacy and discretion, but from which she could also easily exit via the perron to gain access to the gardens, in complete independence.

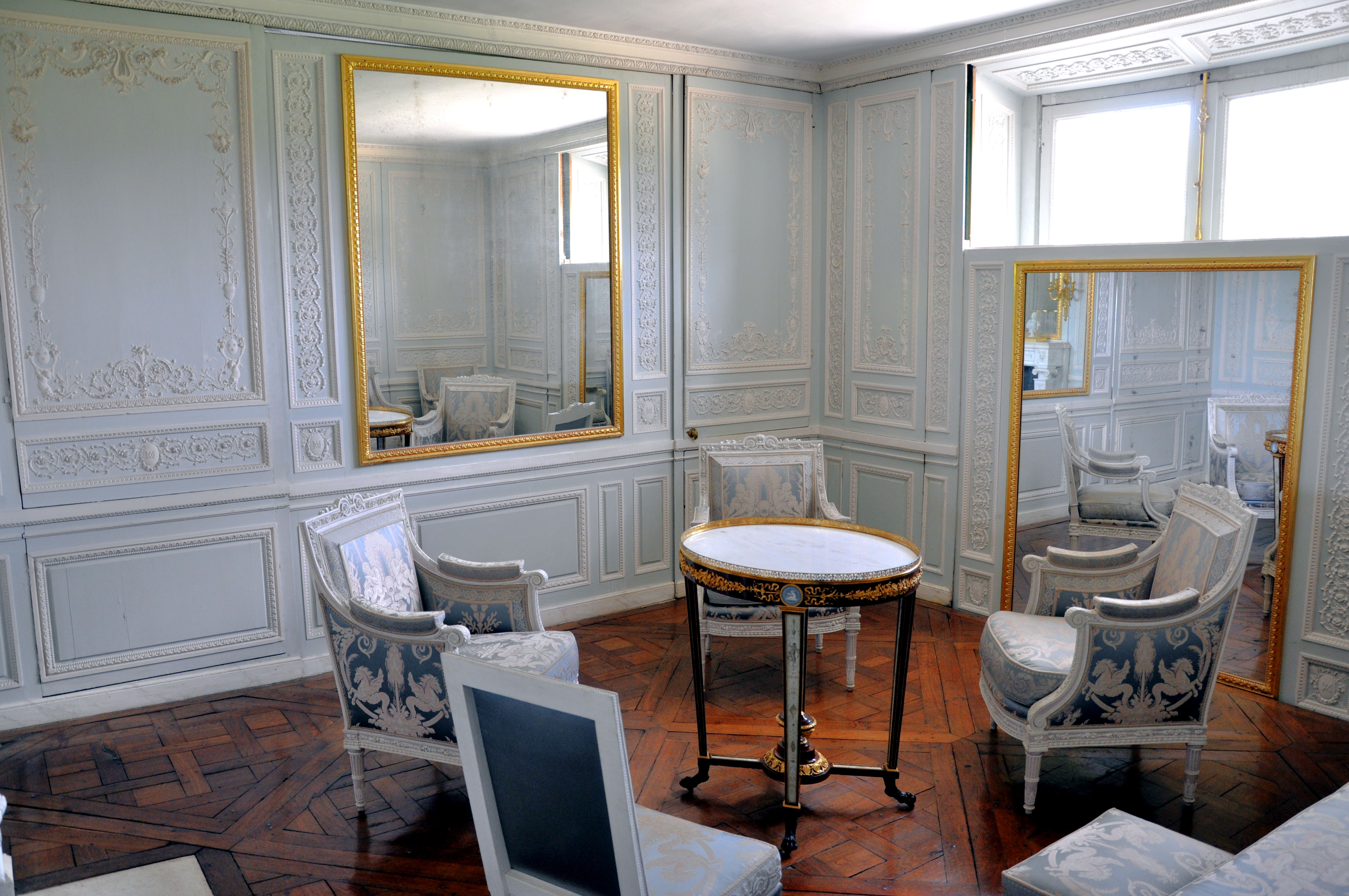
The Queen's boudoir.

In 1787, Marie-Antoinette asked her architect Mique to redesign the decoration of this room, which until then had been "elegantly decorated". The brothers Jules-Hugues and Jean-Siméon Rousseau created richly carved panelling in the arabesque style: the sculptures stand out in white against a background painted blue, in the manner of Wedgwood's cameos, a sign of France's new taste for Anglomania. Flowers play an important role, inspired by the surrounding gardens. The narrow panels are adorned with bouquets of roses in bloom. The wider panels show the fleur-de-lys shield supported by ribbons, with light smoke cassolettes, doves, crowns, and quivers of love. The Queen's cipher appears framed by two loving torches adorned with roses.

This renovation marked the first stage in the planned renewal of all the decorations in the Queen's flats, which was interrupted by the Revolution.

The furniture commissioned by Marie-Antoinette from Georges Jacob in 1786 consisted of a daybed, three armchairs and two chairs, all covered with a blue silk poult de soie trimmed with lace and silk embroidery. This furniture was dispersed during the Revolution, but during the restoration of the château in the 2000s, furniture of similar origin and workmanship was installed, coming from the Count of Provence's pavilion located near the pièce d'eau des Suisses. (Note: This pavilion, built by Chalgrin, disappeared during the 19th century.) Created in 1785 by Jacob to designs by the ornamentalist Dugourc and made in the Reboul and Fontebrune workshops in Lyon, it is upholstered in a blue lampas with a large white arabesque pattern depicting Cyclops.

On the white marble mantelpiece with columns set in sheaths, installed in 1787, is a reproduction of a clock created for Marie-Antoinette in 1780 by the sculptor François Vion and the clockmaker Jean-Antoine Lépine, in chased ormolu on a white marble base. Known as "La Douleur " or "La Pleureuse d'oiseau", it depicts a young woman mourning the death of her bird on an altar, while a lover offers her another. On either side are two 19th century Sèvres biscuit busts, based on models by Boizot, representing the Russian Queen Catherine I and her son Paul I.

The boudoir was emptied of its furniture and "moving glass" system during the French Revolution. When she moved to the Petit Trianon, the Duchess of Orléans had a set of gondola-shaped furniture brought in, comprising two armchairs, twelve chairs, and footstools, delivered in 1810 by the upholsterer Darrac for the music room in the French Pavilion. Originally covered in blue and white damask, it was reupholstered in 1837 in "a Persian fabric with a white background, stripes with small bouquets, with a lilac and white silk crest, suspended from gilded thyrses". A "whimsical and confusing" armchair was installed in the boudoir on the Duchess's instructions in 1837: in a Gothic style tending towards the Indonesian, it was made of blackened wood with twisted uprights and crosspieces and covered by the upholsterer Perrelle with an upholstered perse.

==== The Queen's bedroom ====
This room, like the adjoining boudoir and dressing room, has a lowered ceiling, creating the upper level of the entresol, which accentuates the feeling of intimacy. This was King Louis XV's retiring cabinet. As in the other rooms, Guibert created the carved decoration for the paneling, on the theme of plants, combining baskets and festoons topped with shells. Médard Brancourt, a regular on Gabriel's building sites, painted and gilded the plaster cornices and oak panelling, as he did throughout the château. The narrow pilaster panels are more simply decorated with roses au naturel and small bouquets. The cabinet has four mirror overmantels. The Spanish brocatelle mantel, intended for the Château de Saint-Hubert, was installed here in 1764 after the death of the Marquise de Pompadour, and embellished with rococo sculptures by Honoré Guibert, who also supplied two small consoles. The cabinet is surrounded by a sofa, two armchairs, and six chairs in green and white gros de Tours.

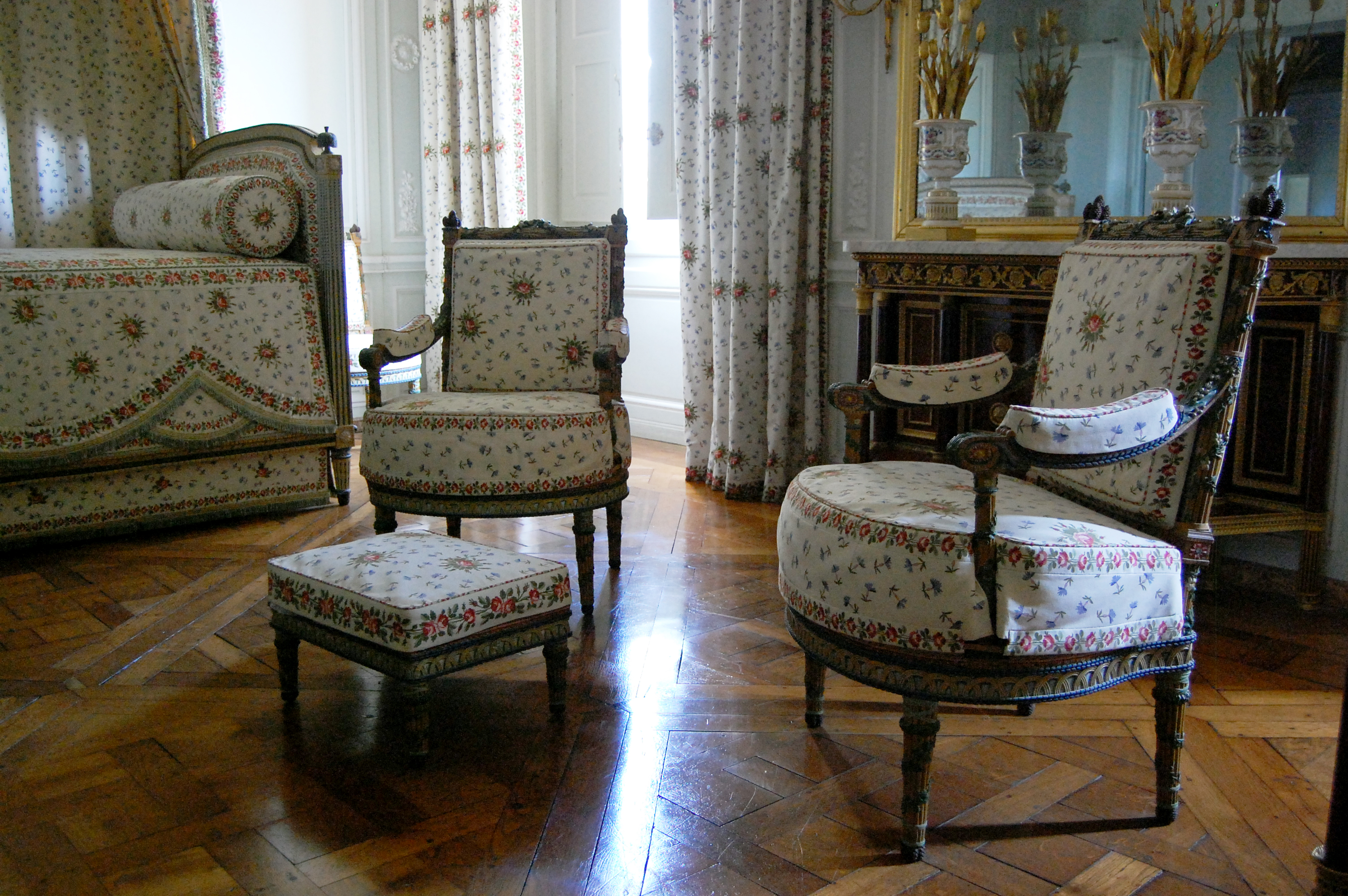
Thorn furniture designed by Georges Jacob for the Queen's bedroom.

In 1772, the room was converted into a bedroom for Madame du Barry, who until then had occupied a flat in the attic. Two overmantels were removed to accommodate the new furniture ordered from the Foliot carpenters, varnished white by the widow Bardou and upholstered in white Pekin painted with flowers and braids of leaves by the upholsterer Capin.

Marie-Antoinette made this room her own when she moved into the château. Despite the later writings of her first chambermaid, Madame Campan, (Note: She wrongly claimed that none of the furniture had changed between 1774 and 1789, which needs to be qualified.) she wished to renew the furniture in this room or, at the very least, had it re-gilded and covered with a newly painted Pekin in 1776. However, she made no changes to the decoration of the wood paneling carved with flowers. Finally, in 1787, she commissioned the cabinetmaker Georges Jacob to create a new set of furniture known as "Les épis", comprising a bed, a bergère, two armchairs, two chairs, a footstool, a fireplace screen, and a toilet armchair. The country-style fantasy designed by Jean-Démosthène Dugourc is once again in evidence. The sculpture by Jean-Baptiste Rode depicts ears of wheat bound in a spiral by ribbons with branches of ivy, pine cones, and sprigs of lily of the valley. The fabric, a basin from England, was embroidered in the Lyon workshops of the widow Marie-Olivier Desfarges with delicate cornflowers and garlands of roses, the Queen's favorite flowers, which she enjoyed drawing with her protégé, Pierre-Joseph Redouté, nicknamed the "Raphael of flowers". The bed was sculpted by Pierre-Claude Triquet. All the paintings for the furniture were entrusted to Jean-Baptiste Chaillot de Prusse, a painter, which led the page Hézecques to say that "the liveliness of the colors defied the most experienced brush".

The bed was sold in 1793 along with the rest of the furniture in the Petit Trianon but was never found, unlike the other pieces of furniture in this room, which were returned to their original position: "a pulpit bed with columns and trellises, married in jasmine and honeysuckle, complete with its fabrics in white Indian basin, embroidered in wool with its cords". (Note: The lot was sold for £1,512 to Charles Hébert, a cabinetmaker in the Faubourg Saint-Antoine in Paris.) It was replaced by a bed created in 1780 for the Château de Fontainebleau and repainted in the colors of the original furniture as part of a restitution.

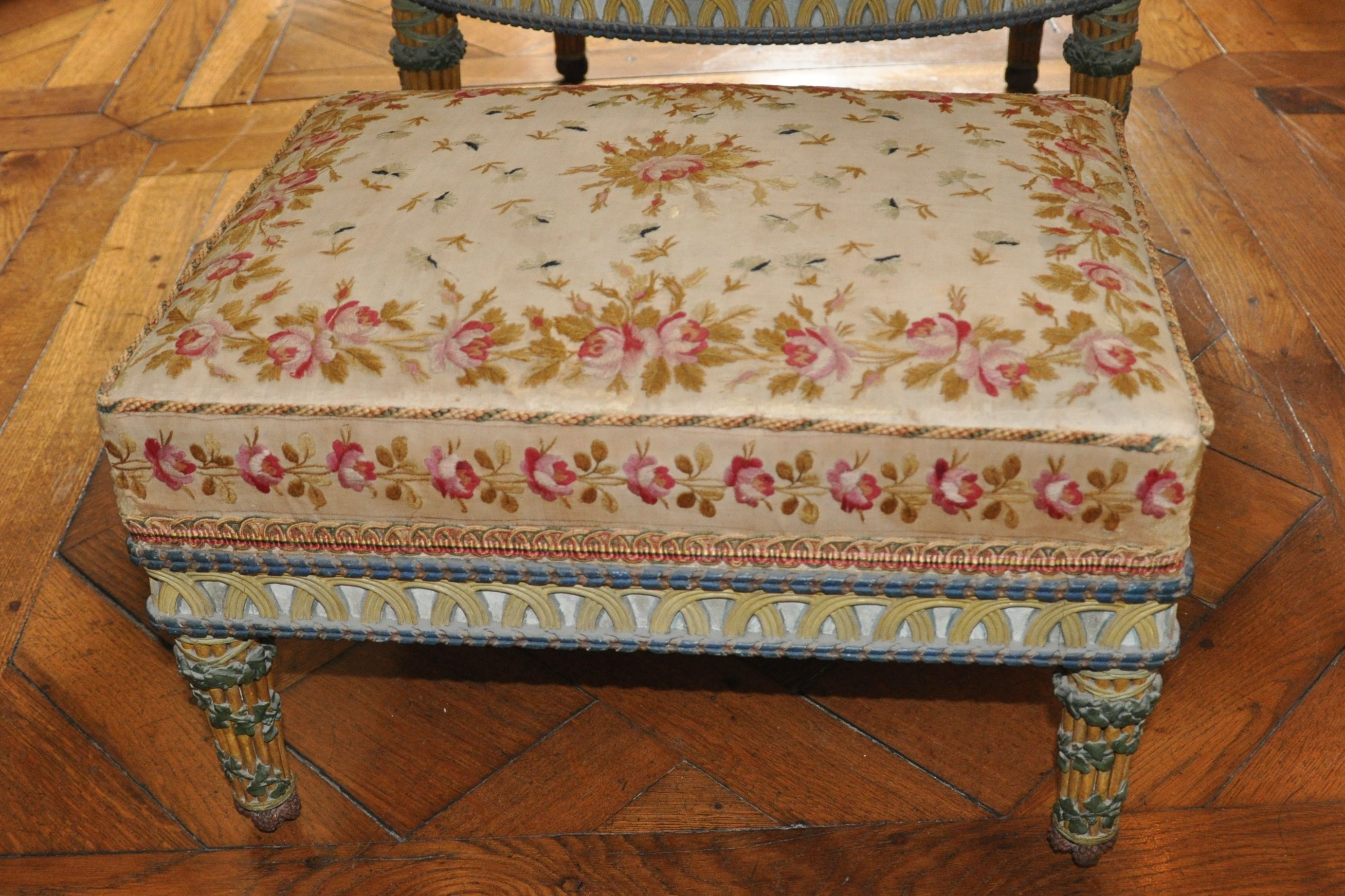
Foot stool from the "Les épis" furniture designed by Georges Jacob. The fabric is original.

The modest dimensions of the bedroom and bed contrast with those of the Queen's bedroom in the château. This difference underlines the desire for serenity in this "haven of peace", reinforced by the view of the Temple of Love, erected in 1778. It was behind these windows that, for several years, the Queen realized her dream of an "enchanted garden where she could finally take off her crown, rest from representation, and resume her will and her caprice". This feeling of a "masterpiece, a bucolic view" is still preserved today.

In the 19th century, the room was occupied by Pauline Borghese, Napoleon's sister, from 1806. Marie-Louise succeeded her as Empress. The ceiling was hung in white silk with gold lamé, the upholsterer Darrac supplied the sky-blue satin curtains with gold braiding and the Empress's cabinetmaker, Pierre-Benoît Marcion, (Note: Pierre-Benoît Marcion, ébéniste de Napoléon (1769–1840).) supplied the furniture around a single gilded wooden bed, including a chest of drawers and a secretary, as well as a gilded wood and white marble pedestal table and two mahogany night tables.

The Duchess of Orléans, who moved to the Petit Trianon, had the first floor modified and, in particular, had the chair wardrobe refitted in 1837. Access to the chair wardrobe from the Queen's bedroom was via a narrow corridor, which also led to a bathroom in which the Duchess had the tin-plated copper bathtub installed, covered with a flounced cotton cover. The commode displayed in this bathroom was the first piece of furniture ordered by Marie-Antoinette when she took possession of the château in 1774; it was made by Daniel Deloose and delivered by Jean-Henri Riesener.

A double bed from the Empire period, enlarged and restored by Louis-Édouard Lemarchand, replaced Marie-Louise's bed in 1838. It was carved in gilded wood by Pauwels-Zimmermann and joined the Empress's furniture, which included two bergères, an apple tree, (Note: Another name for the méridienne.) four chairs, two footstools, and a fireplace screen. However, the old sky-blue satin was replaced by upholsterer Jean-Louis Laflèche with a blue cannetillé braided with three colors.

==== Bathroom ====
Since the time of Marie-Antoinette, Louis XV's former botanical library has been a small toilette, with no particular decoration. In 1810, Marie-Louise acquired gondola-shaped chairs, painted in grey with white rechamp, upholstered by the upholsterer Darrac in toile de Jouy with a green background inlaid with a medallion. The two armchairs, four chairs, and two footstools were reupholstered in 1828 by Laflèche in damask jaune. In May 1837, Louis-Édouard Lemarchand delivered several pieces of rosewood furniture, including a mirror cabinet, a dressing table, and a writing table, revealing a "Louis-Philippe style" that is still little known today.

=== Entresol ===
Plan of the mezzanine floor of the Petit Trianon. A. Library. B. Lady-in-waiting's bedroom. C. First chambermaid's room. D. Staircase. E. Chair wardrobe. F. Bathroom. G. Spiral staircase.

The mezzanine floor of the Queen's flats – restored in 2008 and now open to guided tours for the first time – houses her library and the bedrooms of the ladies-in-waiting and chambermaids. It is located just above the boudoir and the Queen's bedroom. It is accessed via the small staircase leading to the attic flats. Three mezzanine rooms overlook the botanical garden, which became Marie-Antoinette's English garden, with the Temple of Love as its main viewpoint.

==== Marie-Antoinette Library ====
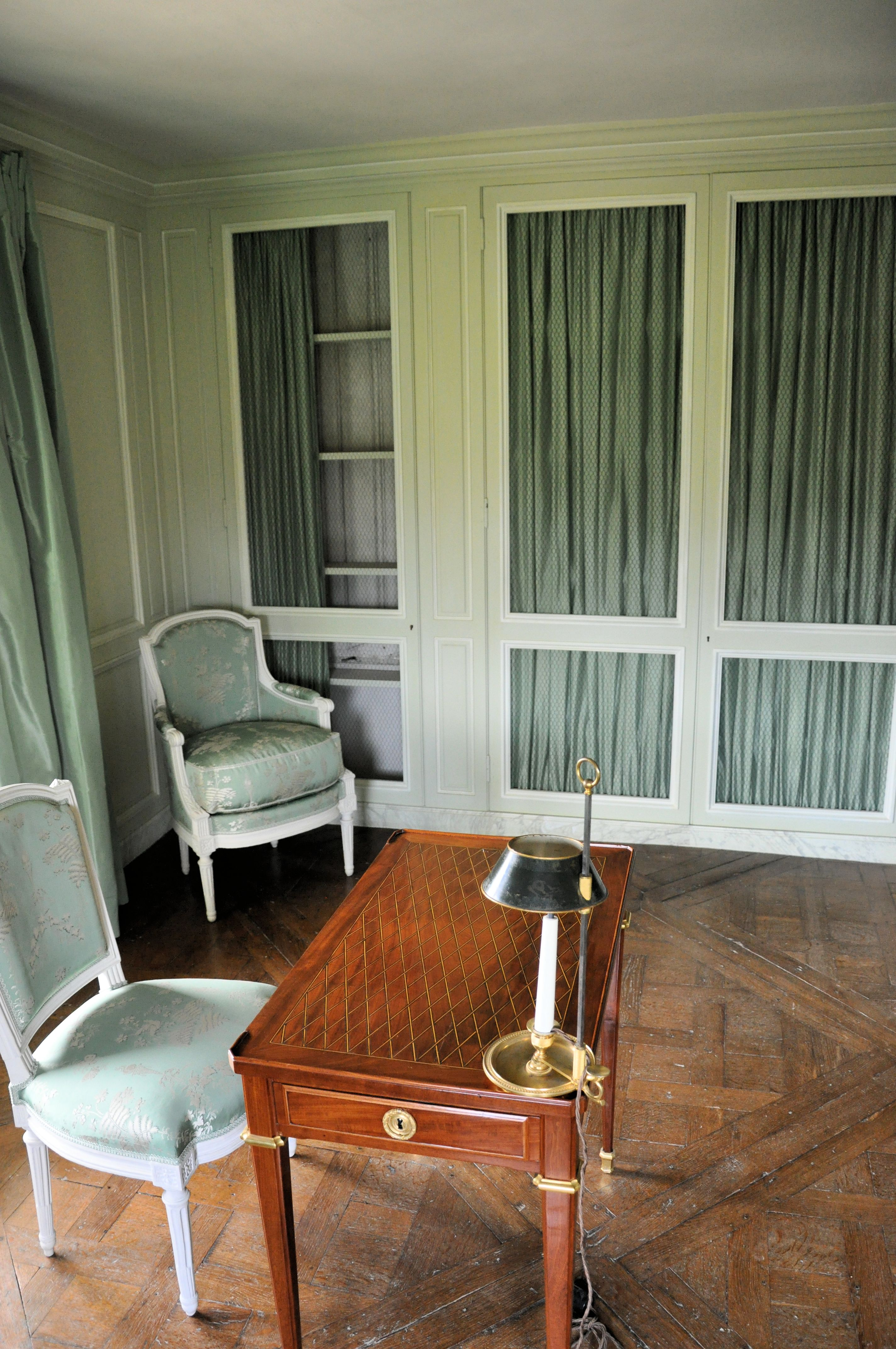
Marie-Antoinette's library, on the mezzanine floor.

Located in the north-east part of the château, Louis XV's corner cabinet was fitted out on the landing of a private staircase that gave the King access to the attic from the first floor. The staircase had been removed four years earlier when the moving glass windows were installed when in 1780 Marie-Antoinette ordered her architect Richard Mique to convert the room into a library. The large cupboards, "painted in softened white with brass wire mesh panels", were installed in this space. The space was fitted with large cupboards "painted in softened white with brass wire mesh panels". These cupboards, which were dismantled in the 19th century, were not restored until 2008, according to Mique's plans. The large mirrors were framed by a wooden frame, which was then replaced by a metal frame. The large mirrors are framed in copper and the print drawers have knobs representing an Austrian eagle. The library was created by Nicolas-Léger Moutard, the Queen's printer and bookseller between 1774 and 1797. It was inventoried during the French Revolution, along with all the works in the château, by the committee chaired by Abbé Grégoire. (Note: The complete inventory was published in 1863 by the curator of the Arsenal library.) These books, bound in full fawn or marbled calf morocco, bear the Queen's coat of arms on gold-free boards and the initials "CT" – "Château de Trianon" – surmounted by a crown, on the backs. Most of them include an introduction to their authors. Of these 1930 volumes, 1328 were devoted to belles-lettres (including 365 to the theatre), 158 to science, and 444 to history. According to Mercy, between 1770 and 1780, the Queen only read around ten books, particularly novels, "having no taste for serious reading [and] only understanding the music of all the arts ". And the composition of this library, like that of the hamlet boudoir or that of the château, was mainly the work of Monsieur Campan, officially Cabinet Secretary to the Queen's librarian, the latter, moreover, the historiographer Moreau, being in no way favored by the Queen. The Queen undoubtedly never frequented this room, the books being brought to her as she wished.

==== Lady-in-waiting's bedroom ====
When the château was built, the mezzanine floor only had one bedroom and an anteroom, with the two corners occupied by staircases. The central room was reserved for the King's intimates and his favorite. Marie-Antoinette housed her successive ladies-in-waiting here during her stays at the Petit Trianon, no doubt the Countess de Noailles, but above all the loyal Princess de Chimay, who took on this role in 1775 when the Princess de Lamballe was appointed superintendent of the Queen's household.

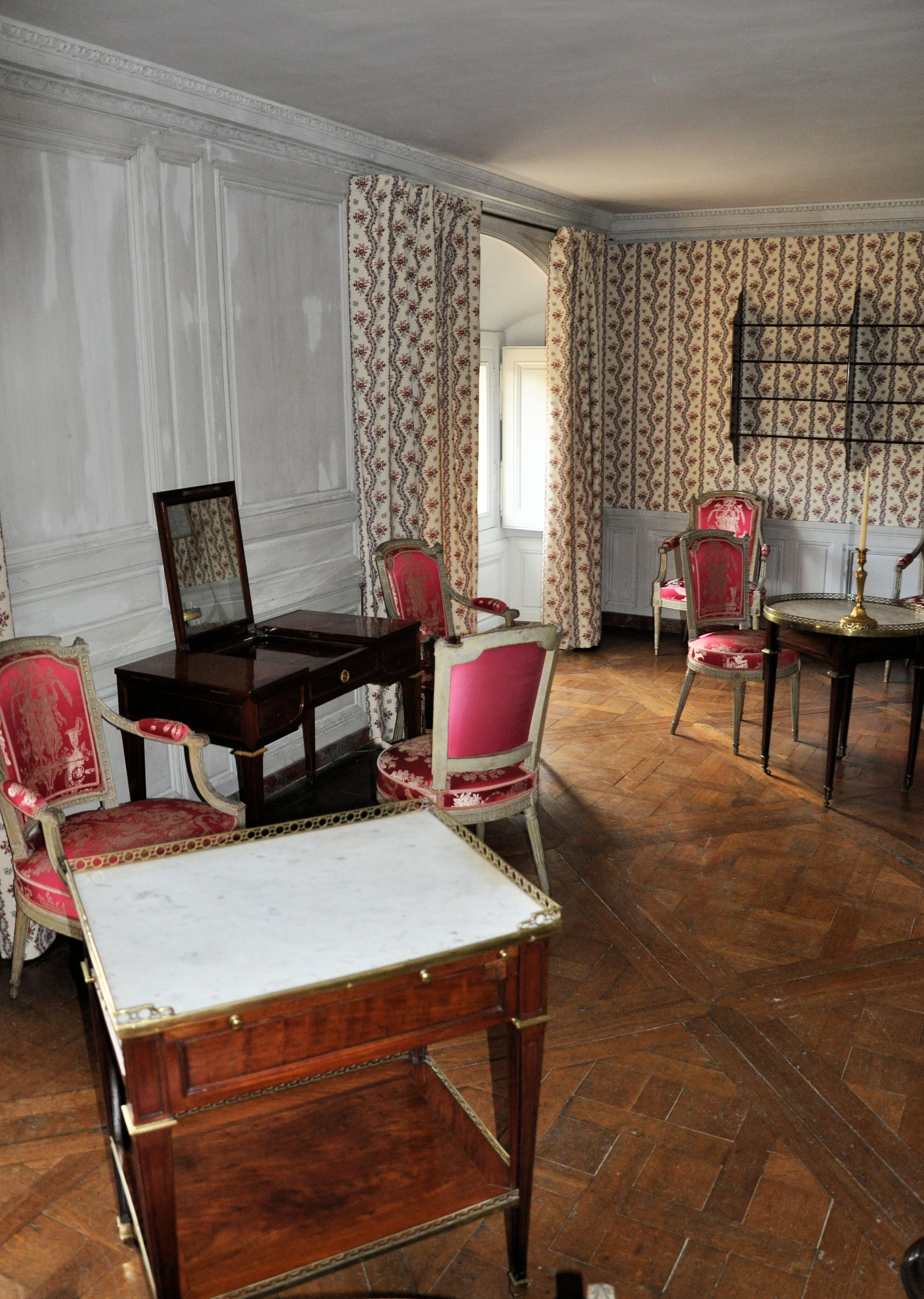
The lady-in-waiting's bedroom, on the mezzanine floor.

During the Empire, the bedroom was given to the maid of the Princess Borghese, Napoleon's sister. Under the July Monarchy, it was occupied by a chambermaid to the Duchesse d'Orléans. The current decoration is a recreation of the reference situation in 1789. The country toilette, attributed to Jean-Henri Riesener, bears the fire and brush mark of the furniture repository at the Château de Trianon. On the other hand, the armchairs and cabriolet chairs, the work of master cabinetmaker Jacques Gay, although contemporary with Marie-Antoinette, were not placed in the Petit Trianon until the 19th century.

==== First chambermaid's room ====
A simple anteroom under Louis XV, this room was occupied by Marie-Antoinette's first chambermaid. The most of these was Madame Campan, born Henriette Genêt, first chambermaid and then principal chambermaid in 1786, succeeding Madame de Misery. (Note: Julie Louise Betauld de Chemault was the wife of Charles-François Bibault de Misery, Baron de Biaches, Esquire and Ordinary Cloakbearer to the King.) The room was simply decorated; the doors to the alcove were not installed until the Revolution.

==== Bathroom ====
The mezzanine extends towards the center of the château, behind the drawing room where it receives light only from the main staircase. It houses the Queen's lady-in-waiting.

It was only at Louis-Philippe's request, in 1837, that this area was fitted out by the architect Nepveu along the same lines as the lower floor: a bathroom was created, adjoining the bedroom occupied by the Duchess of Orléans' maid. An English-style wardrobe or "chair cabinet " was kept in the adjoining room. The small spiral staircase was also built in the 19th century, by reducing the depth of the former maid's room, to provide a link with the attic flat of the King's eldest son, Ferdinand, Duke of Orléans, and his wife, Princess Hélène de Mecklembourg-Schwerin.

=== Attic ===
Plan of the attic of the Petit Trianon. A. Louis XV's antechamber. B. Louis XV's bedroom. C. Cabinet of Louis XVI. D. Madame Royale's parlor. E. Madame Elisabeth's parlor. F. Marie-Louise's dressing room.G. Marie-Louise's bedroom. H. Small blue drawing room. I. Boudoir of the Duchess of Orléans. J. Salon of Empress Eugénie. K. Spiral staircase. L. Chair wardrobe.

The attic floor initially housed Louis XV's flat, accessed via two staircases located at the southeast and northeast corners. (Note: The latter has been removed.) It comprises a bedroom, an anteroom, and a corner cabinet. The rest of the floor was reserved for the "seigneurs" or, to be more precise, the rooms overlooking the gardens were occupied by the "leading members of the king's retinue". The center of the attic is a maze of dimly lit cupboards housing the staff, bringing the number of beds for both masters and servants to around twenty. A few small black cupboards contain pierced chairs. The captain of the bodyguards and the first valet occupy the rooms adjacent to the king's flat, the rest being organized into six apartments.

==== Louis XV's antechamber ====
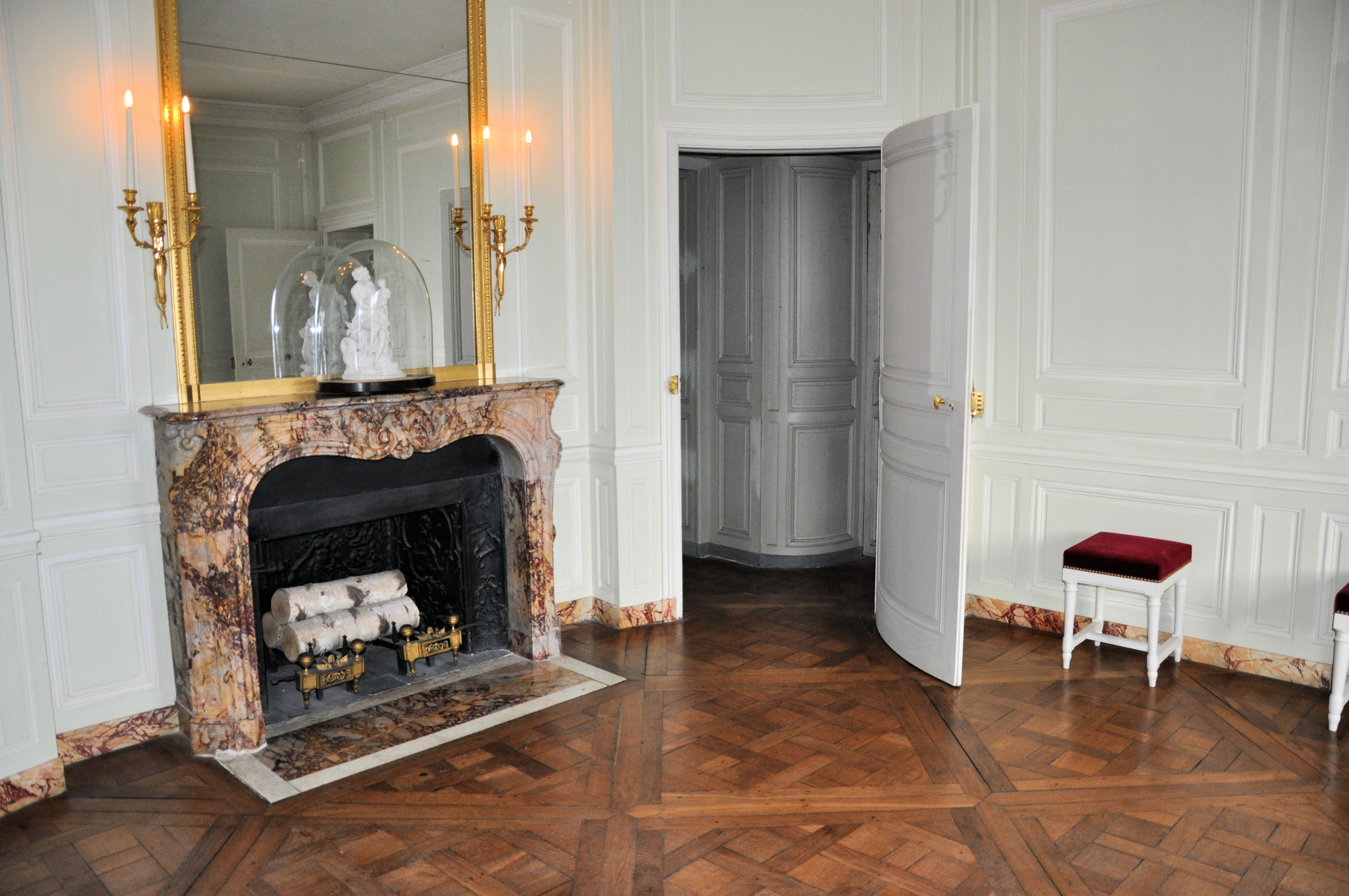
Louis XV's attic antechamber.

The Louis XV antechamber is located between the main staircase and the King's bedroom. Its wood paneling, installed in 1768, is soberly decorated and painted in a water-green color. It is a replacement for architraves from the Élysée Palace, bequeathed by the Marquise de Pompadour. The two rounded corners of the room lead to a wardrobe and a cabinet with a pierced chair, also accessible via a door hidden in the bedroom curtain. The fireplace is probably of the same origin and is carved in Sarrancolin marble. The compensation regulator, with parquet floor, is a Robert Robin movement. Its case is in mahogany, with openwork and glazed panels, and decorated with ormolu oves with wreaths of flowers and branches of oak and laurel.

==== Louis XV's bedroom ====
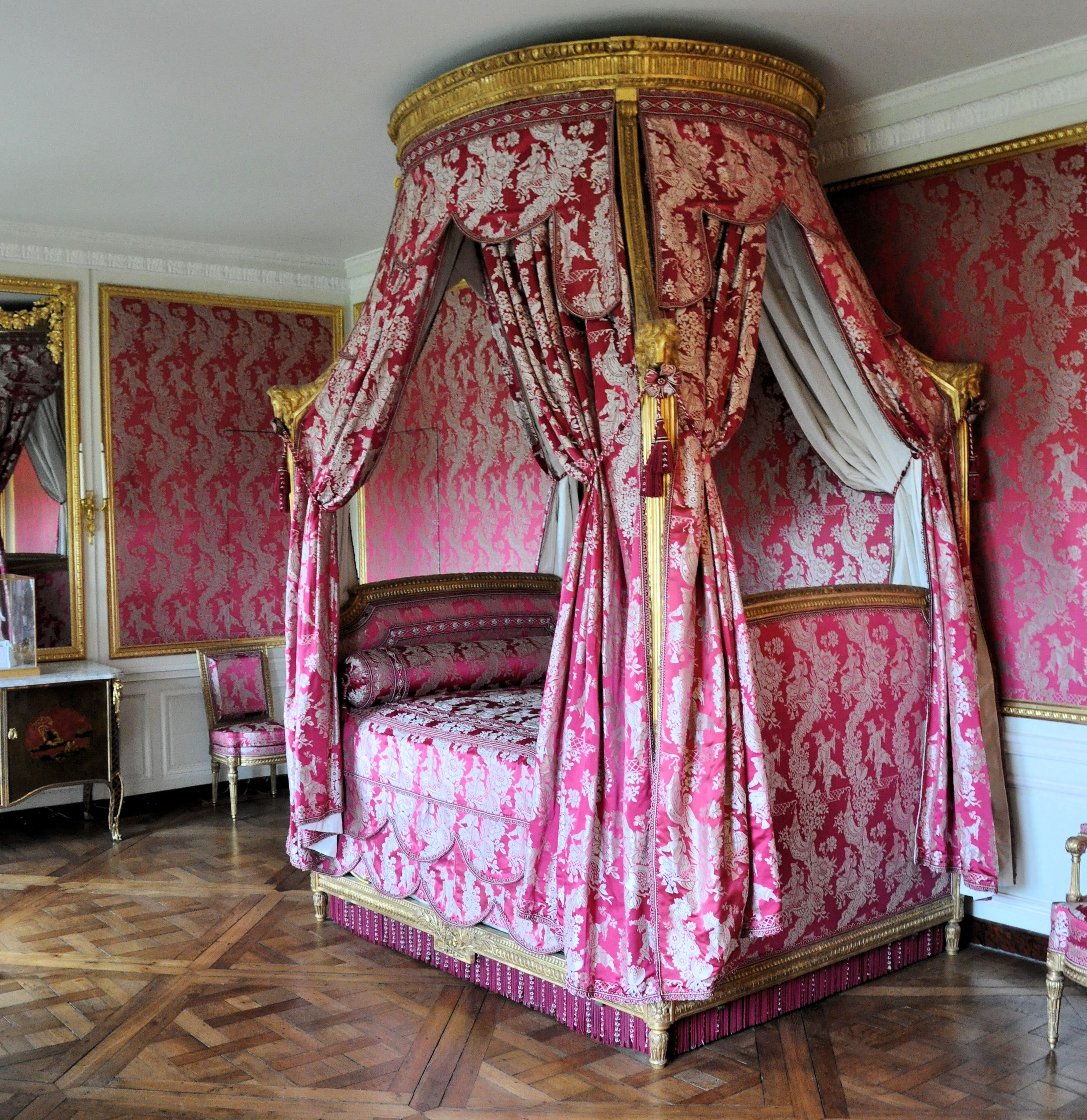
Polonaise bed from the King's bedroom, attic style, 1775

This room was taken over in 1772 by King Louis XV, who granted his inner chambers, located on the lower floor, to Madame du Barry, in an act of derogation from her royal status that seemed unthinkable at the time. His grandson, Louis XVI, who naturally took over this small flat without making any changes to it, never slept at the Petit Trianon, preferring to return to Versailles after walks and dinners.

As the original furniture was not recognized, it was restored in 1985 to its Ancien Régime condition. The Polonaise bed, made of gilded beech and carved with lion's heads, was executed in 1775, replacing the bed made by Nicolas-Quinibert Foliot in the Turkish style. The wall hangings in white and crimson lampas from Lyon, with the same "Chinese music" motif as the furniture, are a reconstruction according to the inventories kept in 1768. The three mirror overmantels reproduce the design found on the masonry during the restoration work begun in 1985.

The Italian griotte marble mantelpiece comes from Marie-Antoinette's small flats in the château, rearranged by Louis-Philippe in 1836.

==== Cabinet of Louis XVI ====
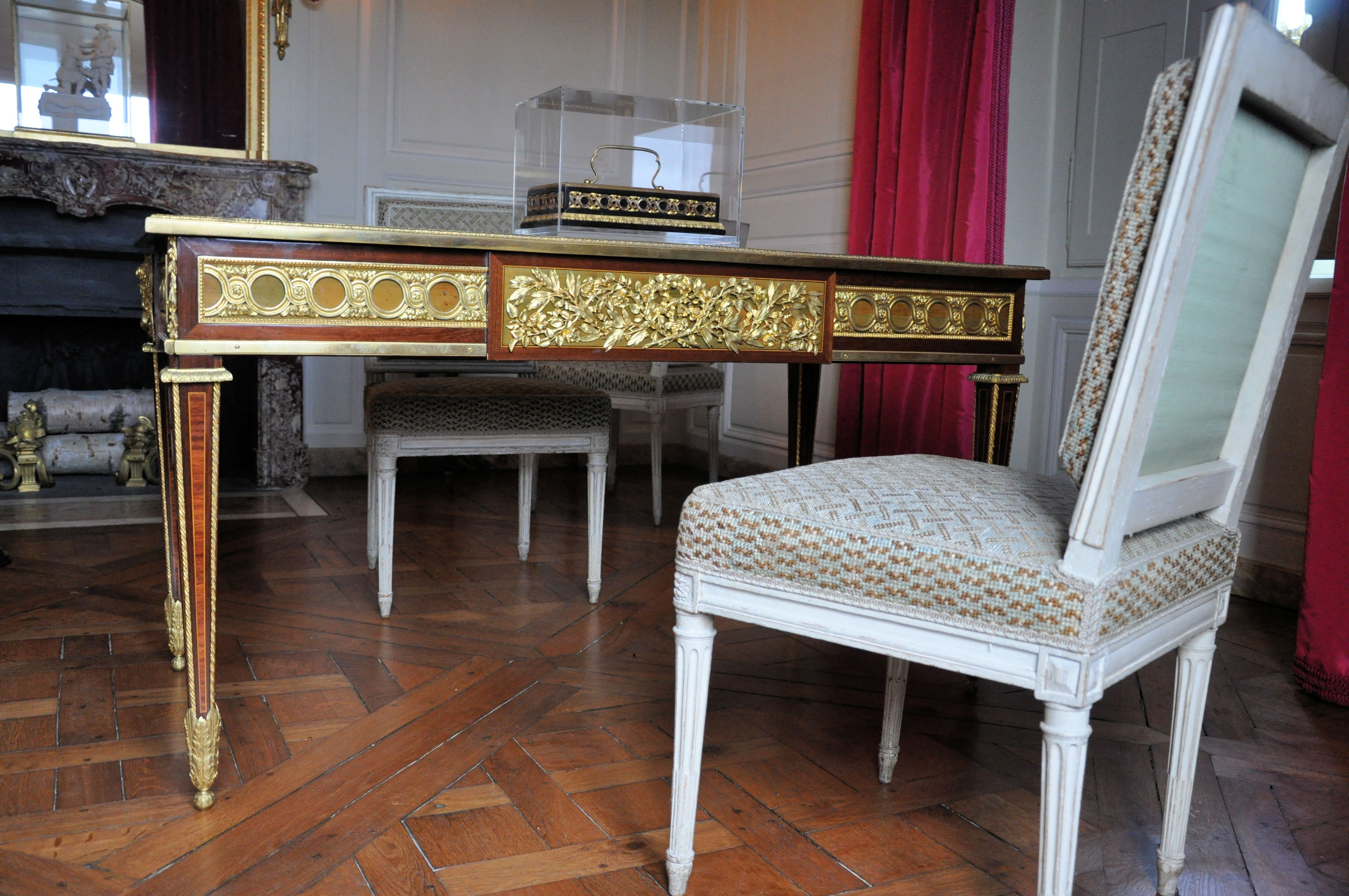
Louis XVI's desk in the king's attic cabinet Jean-Henri Riesener, 1777.

Louis XV's flat ends with a cabinet, located at the corner of the botanical and florist gardens, the last landing of the private staircase leading from the ground floor to the attic. The doors were fitted with special locks designed by François Brochois so that the King could lock them with two turns of the key. Unlike the other rooms in his flat, Louis XVI replaced all of his predecessor's furniture when the staircase was removed. Comprising four pieces, it was entrusted to the cabinetmaker Jean-Henri Riesener in July 1777. The desk was made of satinwood and amaranth veneer, decorated with gilded bronzes and gold braid, and covered with black velvet; sold for 600 livres at the time of the Revolution, although it had cost 4,500 sixteen years earlier, it was returned to its original position in 2002. The chest of drawers is made of the same marquetry, enhanced with veined white marble. A secretary and a small table complete the set. (Note: These two pieces of furniture are currently at Waddesdon Manor in England.)

==== Madame Royale's parlour (evocation) ====
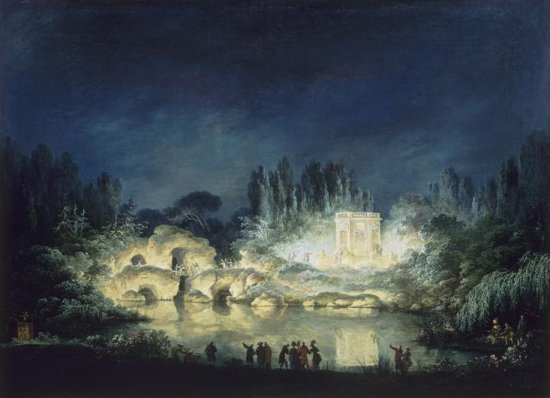
Illumination of the Pavillon du Belvédère, Petit Trianon

In 1782, Marie-Antoinette had one of the attic flats of the "seigneurs" converted into several flats for her eldest daughter Marie-Thérèse, known as "Madame Royale". It was also for herself and her brothers that the Queen had the hamlet built at the same time. She lived close to her aunt, Madame Élisabeth, and her governess, the Duchesse de Polignac.

During the restoration of the attic in 2008, this small room was dedicated to the memory of Madame Royale. The hangings are faithful reproductions of paintings from the Manufacture de Jouy. The room overlooking the Belvedere features a painting by Claude-Louis Châtelet painted in 1781: L'Illumination du Belvédère, depicting the celebration given in honor of Joseph II, Marie-Antoinette's brother, in August 1781.

==== Madame Élisabeth's small salon (evocation) ====
From 1782, Madame Elisabeth occupied her brother Louis XVI's flat at the Petit Trianon, which he never used. This enabled her to look after her niece, Marie-Thérèse, whom the King described as "a second mother to his children".

The small room overlooking the English Garden was dedicated to her during the 2008 restoration work. As in the room next door, the hangings reproduce paintings from Jouy-en-Josas. The lilac motif comes from the bedroom of the factory's owner, Oberkampf.

==== Marie-Louise's dressing room (evocation) ====
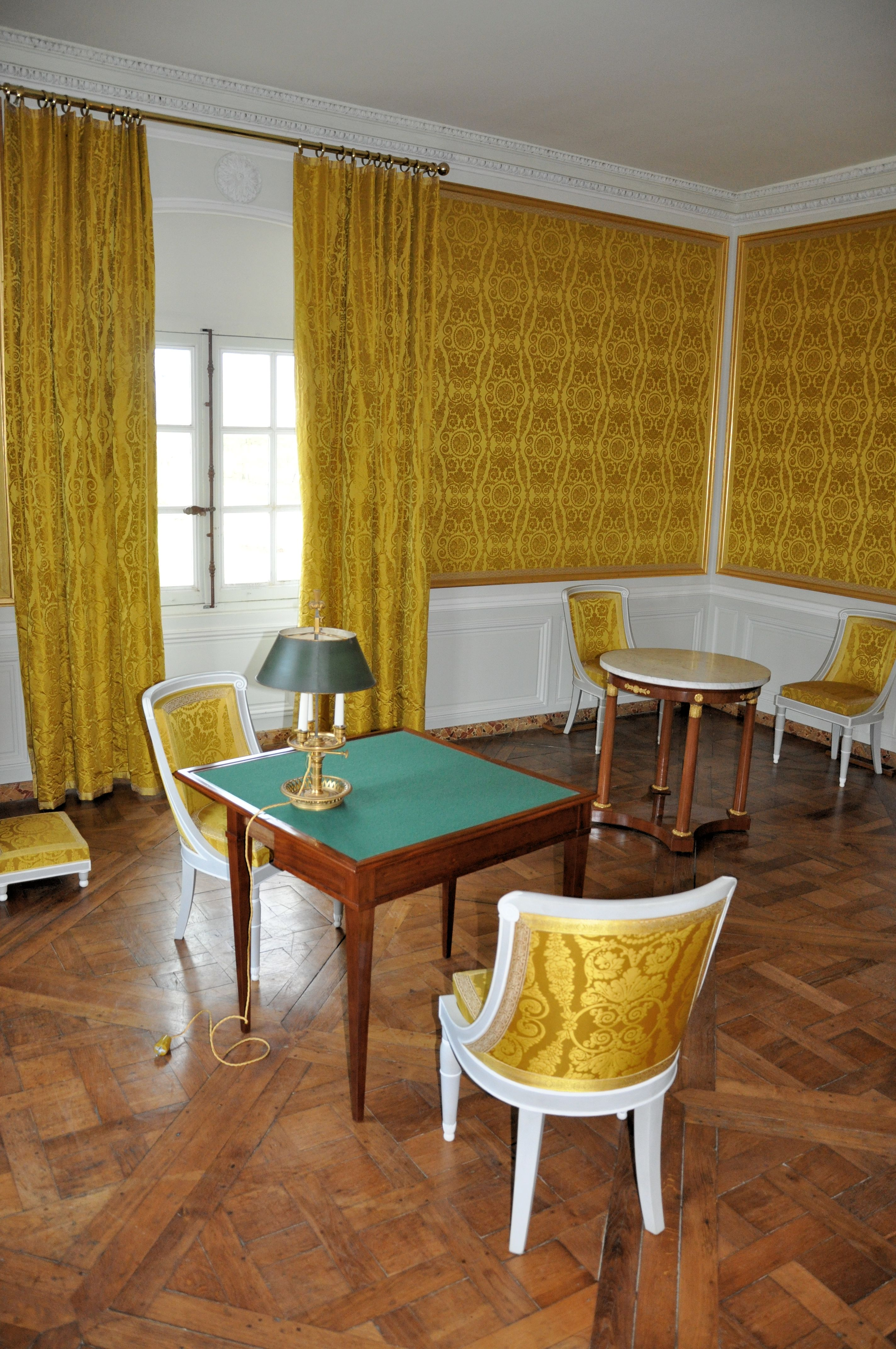
The attic evokes the dressing room in the time of Marie-Louise and then the Duchesse d'Orléans.

This small room in the northwest corner of the building, overlooking both the French Garden and the Botanical Garden – later the Belvedere – was one of the rooms reserved for the Lords of the Suite under Louis XV. In Marie-Antoinette's time, it was probably used by one of the Queen's intimates. It is one of the few rooms on the first floor to have a small wardrobe and a servant's room. During the 2008 restoration, it was fitted out to evoke the dressing room on the first floor, with its decoration and furniture from the time of the Duchesse d'Orléans. The chairs provided for Empress Marie-Louise are simply upholstered in yellow damask, replacing the original green toile de Jouy. The quadrille table comes from the former billiard room and the pedestal table from the moving mirror cabinet.

Since the attic was reopened to the public, the small adjoining room, which was reduced in size when the previous room was enlarged, has been used to display paintings evoking the Petit Trianon estate: a painting by Antoinette Asselineau shows how the small theatre was decorated during the reign of Louis-Philippe; two paintings from the early 19th century evoke the Queen's hamlet.

==== Marie-Louise's bedroom (evocation) ====
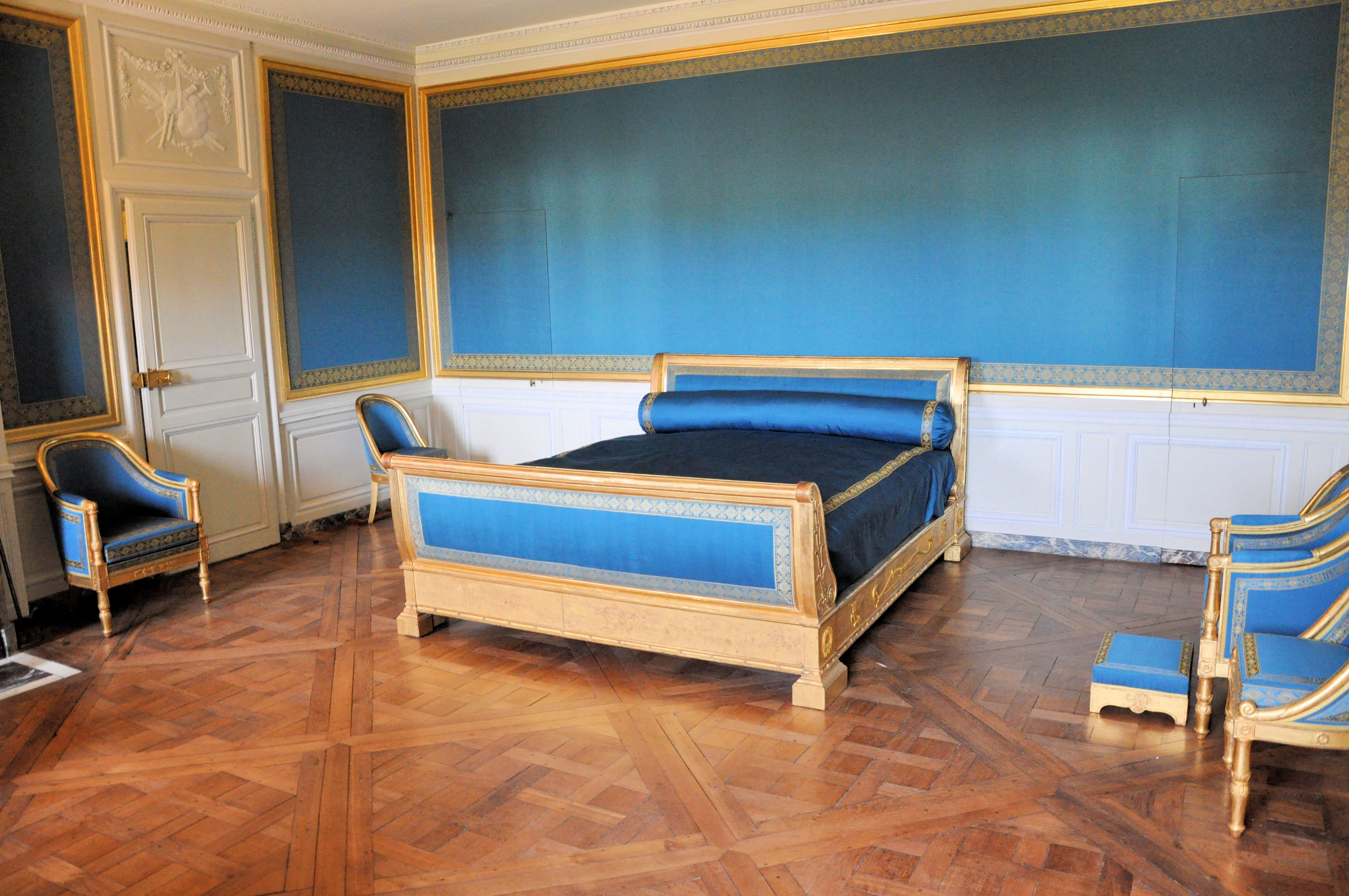
The attic evokes the bedroom of Marie-Louise and later the Duchess of Orléans.

As one of the best-facing rooms in the attic, it was probably occupied by Madame du Barry before she moved to the lower floor, near the King's private staircase. No female furniture was included in the 1768 orders, as Madame de Pompadour had died four years earlier; Louis XV's last mistress was therefore content with the furniture intended for the lords of the court.

The two central flats in the attic overlooking the French Garden, initially of the same configuration and size, were redesigned under Marie-Antoinette to create a larger bedroom, comparable to the Queen's bedroom overlooking the English Garden. During the 2008 restoration, this large room was redesigned to evoke the bedroom of Marie-Louise and then the Duchess of Orléans – the former "Queen's bedroom" – with the same furniture and layout as before.

==== Boudoir of the Duchess of Orléans (evocation) ====
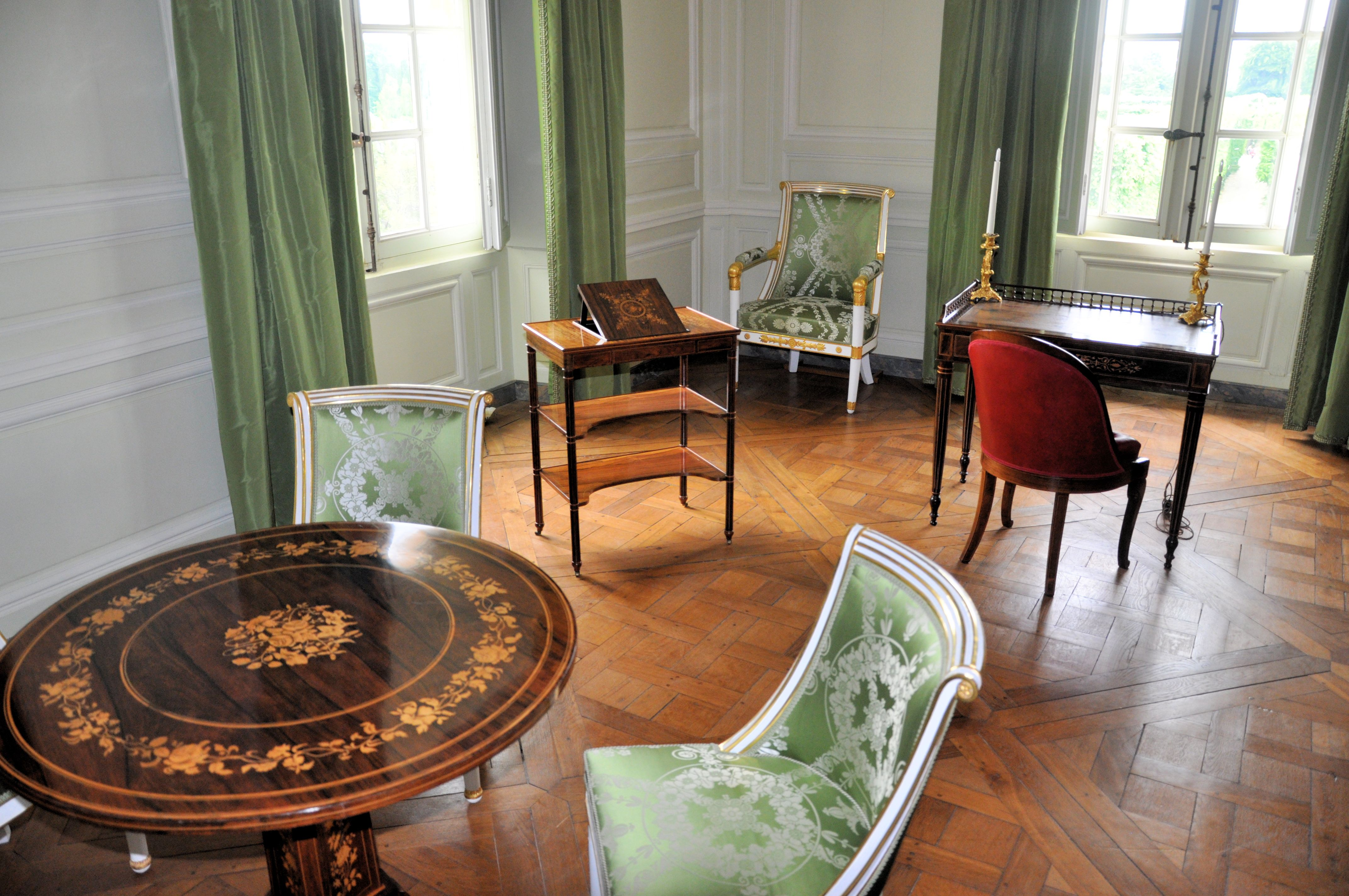
The attic evokes the boudoir of the Duchess of Orléans.

The bedroom in the south-west corner of the attic has retained its Louis XV layout, with a wardrobe and adjacent servants' quarters. It was fitted out in 2008 to evoke the boudoir as it was when the Duchess of Orléans was in the château. This is the only room in the museum that refers to the Duchess, as it is furnished only with furniture delivered especially for her. However, the previous two rooms, although containing furniture that had previously belonged to Empress Marie-Louise, are well presented with their fabrics restored in 1837.

==== Empress Eugenie's room (evocation) ====
Of all the flats on this floor, of which little is known about their occupancy throughout history, one is dedicated to Empress Eugénie in the series of evocations established at the beginning of the 21st century on the attic of the Petit Trianon. On the occasion of the 1867 Universal Exhibition, Napoleon III's wife organised a collection of "furniture, paintings and various objects with a genuine link to the memory of illustrious guests" from Trianon, in homage to Marie-Antoinette, for whom she felt a sympathy bordering on devotion. Following this event, the Petit Trianon became a museum dedicated to the 18th century and to Marie-Antoinette, the queen whose myth was gradually taking hold. The items on display are "Marie-Antoinette objects", either having belonged to her, such as several vases, or evoking her memory. The wall hanging with its large bouquets is a reproduction of a canvas printed in the château in the 19th century.

== In culture ==
=== Cinema ===
The Petit Trianon castle, like the rest of the estate, was exploited by the cinema from a very early stage: (Note: The dates given are those of the filming.)

- 1926: Voir Versailles et mourir, film directed by Henri Diamant-Berger;
- 1927: La Valse de l'adieu, film directed by Henry Roussel;
- 1954: Casa Ricordi (The House of Remembrance), film directed by Carmine Gallone;
- 1955: Marie-Antoinette reine de France, film directed by Jean Delannoy;
- 1960: Robespierre, television film;
- 2000: The Affair of the Necklace, film directed by Charles Shyer;
- 2011: Le Chevalier de Saint-Georges, docu-drama directed by Claude Ribbe;
- 2011: Les Adieux à la Reine, film directed by Benoît Jacquot (Note: The Queen's bedroom, too cramped to accommodate film equipment, was reconstructed at Maisons-Laffitte, but its surroundings and the staircase were filmed at the Petit Trianon.)
- 2012: Je veux le monde (extract from the musical 1789: Les Amants de la Bastille), music video directed by Giuliano Peparini. (Note: Most of the footage was shot in the warming room and the chapel.)

=== Aftershocks around the world ===
A landmark of eighteenth-century architecture, the Petit Trianon château has spawned numerous replicas in France and around the world:

- The Hôtel de Poissac in Bordeaux, built in 1775 by the architect Nicolas Papon, was directly inspired by the south façade of the Petit Trianon.
- The Château de Pignerolle, in Anjou, was built in 1776 by the architect Michel Bardoul de la Bigottière on the model of Gabriel's building.
- The Kentucky governor's mansion, built in 1914, was officially inspired by the Petit Trianon.
- The château de Pierre-Levée, in the Vendée, is an example of the audacity of a wealthy bourgeois who, in 1793, wanted to recreate a royalist symbol.
- In East Flanders, the Château de Ghellinck, sometimes nicknamed the "Little Trianon of Flanders", on the heights of Ghent, was designed in 1785 by Barnabé Guimard, a pupil of Ange-Jacques Gabriel.
- Scott House was built in 1910 in Richmond, the capital of Virginia, in reference to Marie-Antoinette's castle.
- A replica built in 1905 is located in San Francisco, on the corner of Washington Street and Maple Street; acquired in 2007 by Halsey Minor, founder of CNet, it was abandoned in 2012.
- In 1800, Philippe-Joseph Riquet, a lawyer from Lille, undertook to build "a very pretty château" in Cysoing, on the ruins of the former abbey of Sainte-Calixte, inspired by the Petit Trianon.
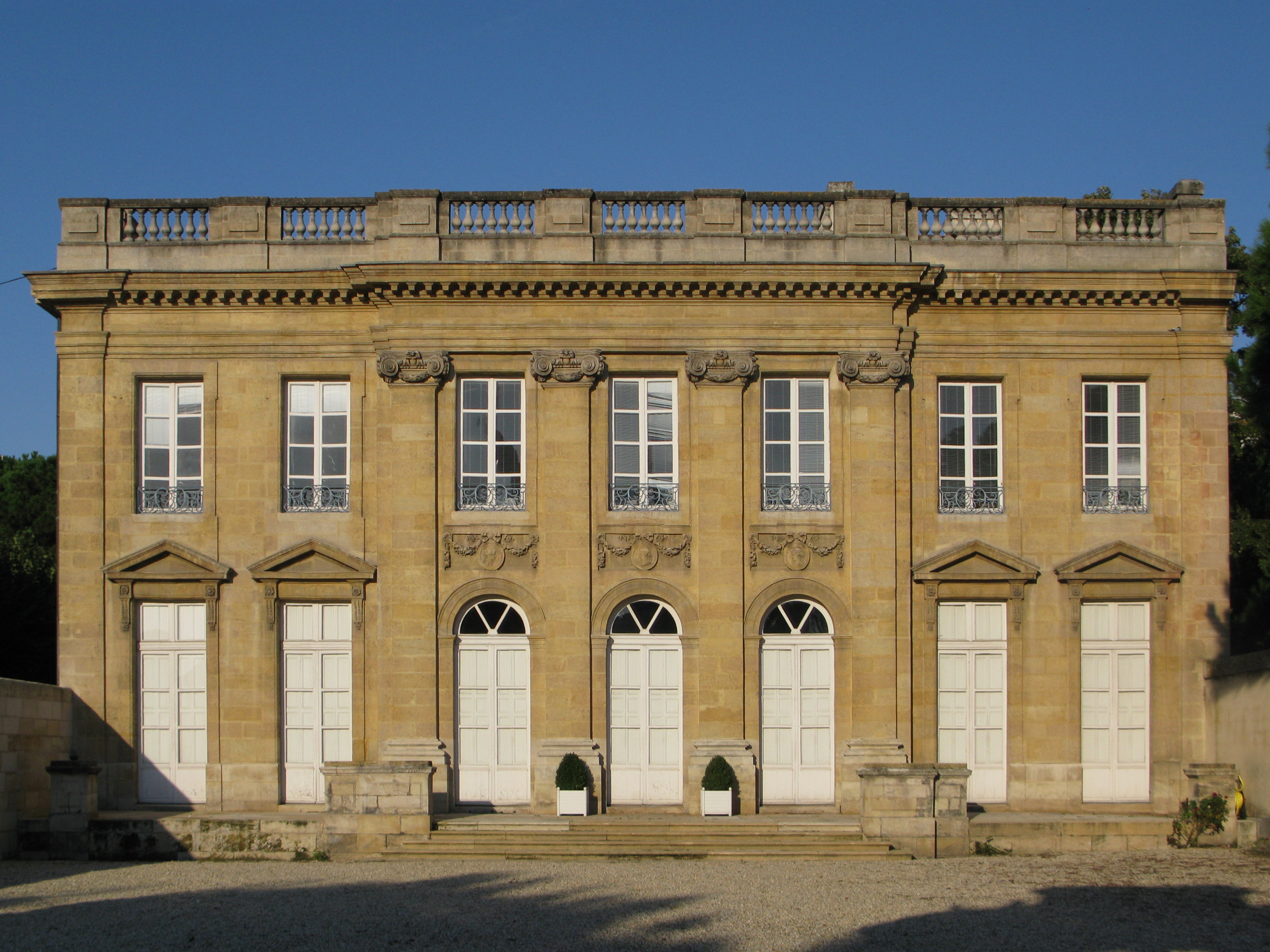
Hôtel de Poissac, Bordeaux.

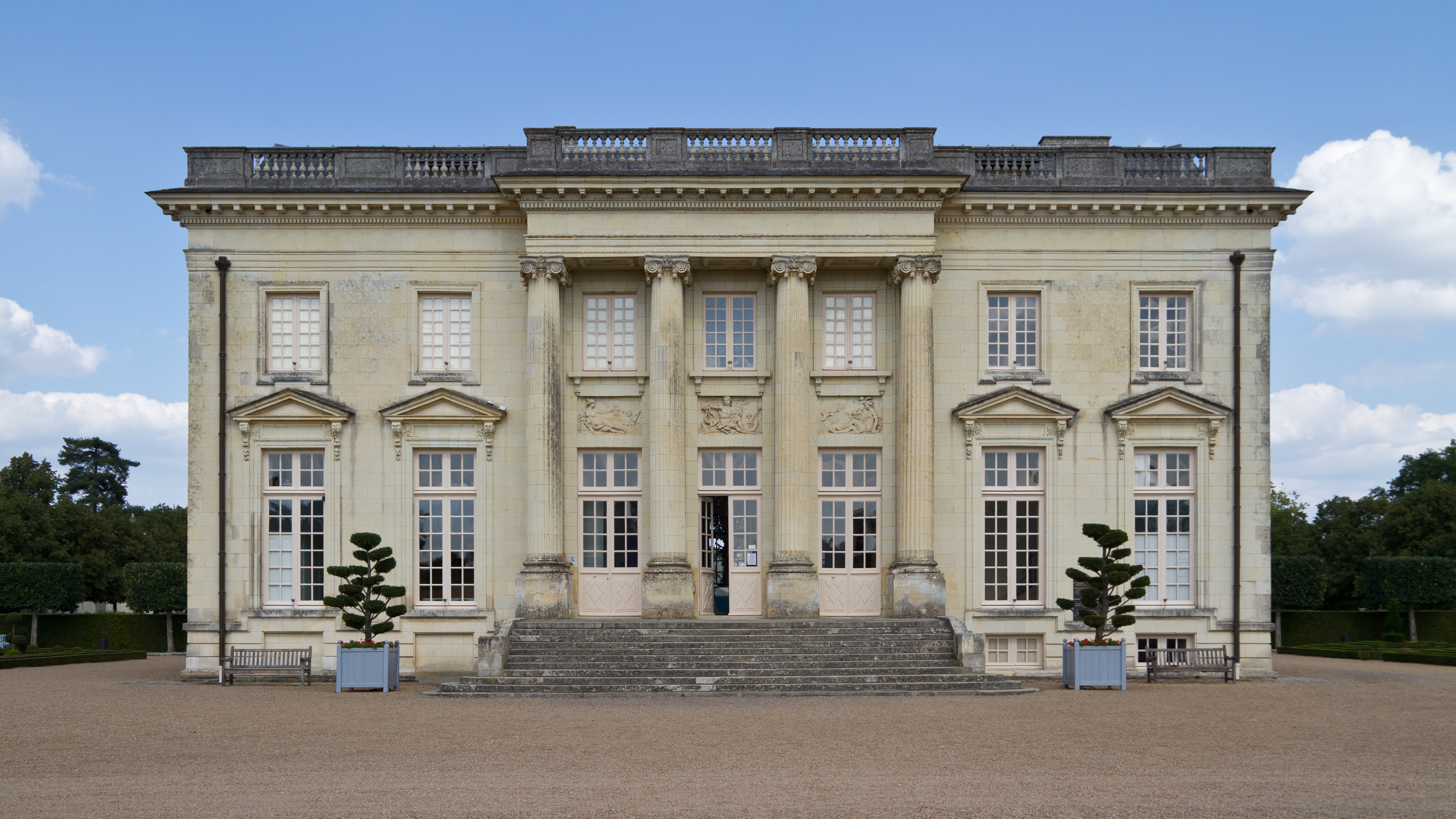
Château de Pignerolle (Anjou).

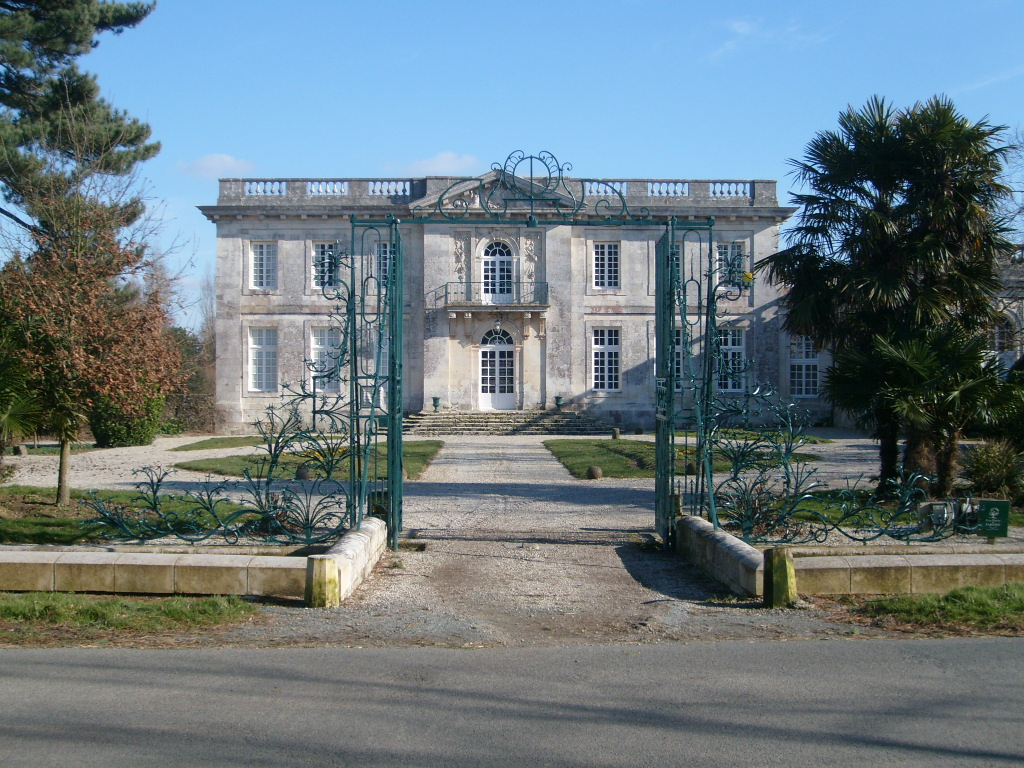
Château de Pierre-Levée (Vendée)

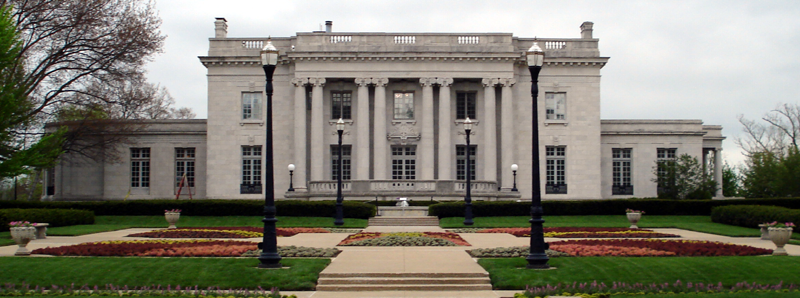
Governor's mansion in Kentucky (USA).

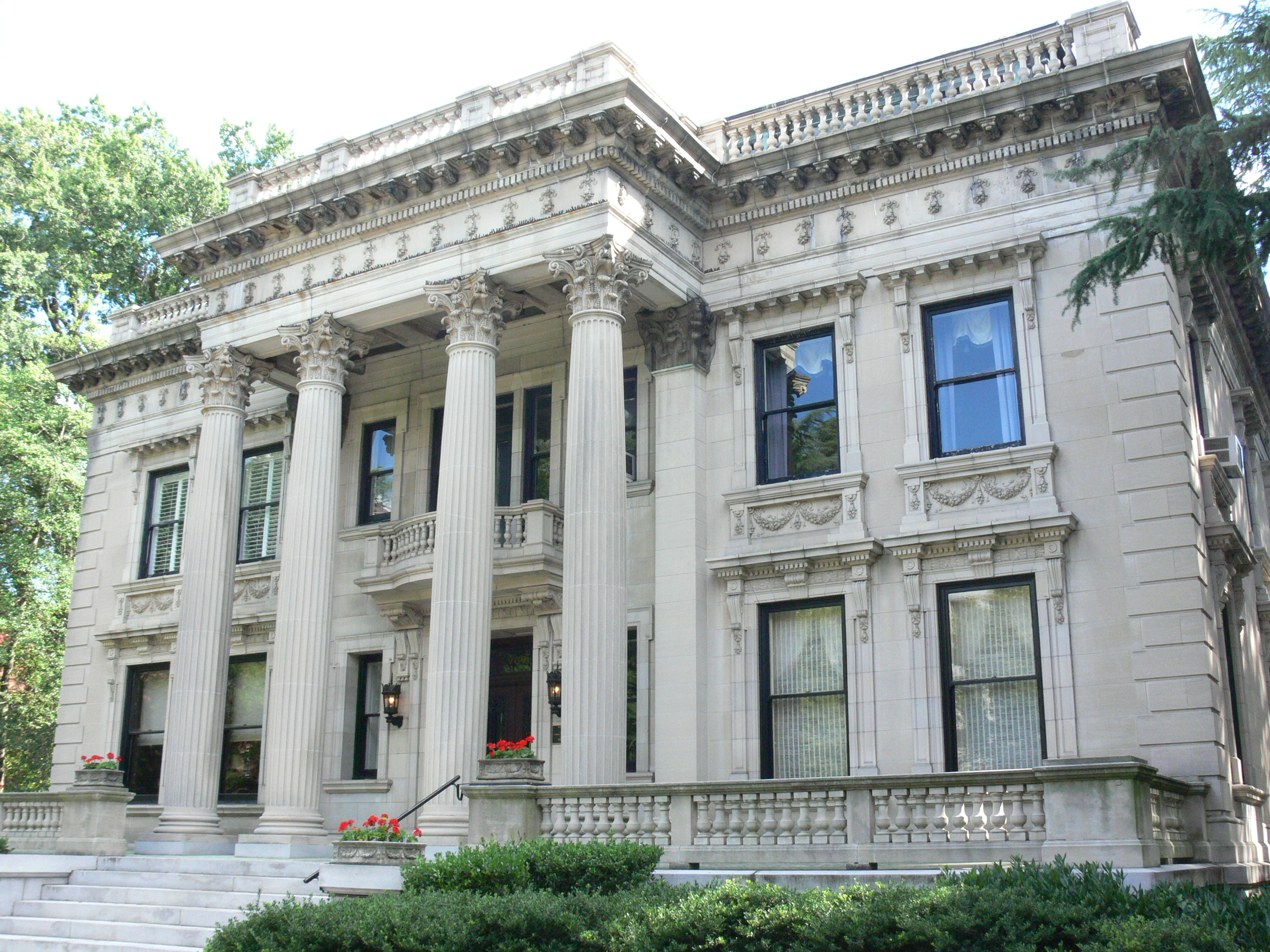
Scott House (USA).

== Derivative buildings ==
=== United States ===
Nemours Estate mansion and gardens, in Wilmington, Delaware, is the largest formal French garden in America. It was built between 1909 and 1935, and was inspired and largely based on the Petit Trianon.

- Belmar (1937) is an exact replica of the Petit Trianon, designed by Colorado architect Jacques Benedict for May Bonfils Stanton in Lakewood, Colorado.
- City Hall (1916) in Eau Claire, Wisconsin as designed by George Awsumb is inspired by Petit Trianon, though not a complete copy.
- Marble House (1888–1892), a Gilded Age mansion in Newport, Rhode Island, is directly inspired by the Petit Trianon.
- Kentucky Governor's Mansion (1912) is inspired by the Petit Trianon.
- Koshland House (1904) in San Francisco, California as designed by Franklin S. Van Trees was modeled after the Petit Trianon.
- A concert hall in San Jose, California, which carries the name "The Petit Trianon", is a copy.
- Byers Hall (1903) at Yale University, is an adaptation of Le Petit Trianon design by architects Hiss and Weekes.
- Northway (1908), also known as Petit Trianon Deux, is an estate in Greenwich, Connecticut, built by an heir to the Goodyear Tires fortune.
- The International Museum of Surgical Science (1917) in Chicago, Illinois is a replica of Le Petit Trianon except it has an additional floor.

=== Elsewhere ===
- Called Petit Trianon, the building housing the Academia Brasileira de Letras in Rio de Janeiro is based on the design. It was built by the French Government and donated to the Academia de Letras.
- Sabet Pasal Mansion, the home of an Iranian pre-revolution entrepreneurial family, was built in northern Tehran.
- The Cantacuzino Palace in Romania, near Florești, also known as Petit Trianon (Micul Trianon), is based on the layout of the French palace.

== See also ==
- Grand Trianon
- Palace of Versailles
- Subsidiary structures of the Palace of Versailles
- Versailles
- List of châteaux in France
- Hameau de la Reine
- Maison de plaisance
- Moberly–Jourdain incident
- Public Establishment of the Palace, Museum and National Estate of Versailles
- Fresh pavilion
