= Hameau =

Hameau (pl. hameaux) is the French word for hamlet (place), a small settlement.

Hameau may also refer to:

- Hameau (garden feature), imitation hamlets built for aristocrats in the 18th century
  - Hameau de Chantilly, Château de Chantilly, 1774
  - Hameau de la Reine, Château de Versailles, 1783 (associated with Queen Marie-Antoinette)
  - Hameau de Chantilly (Paris), Elysée Palace, Paris, 1792, later an entertainment venue
- Le Hameau (Belgium), locality in the Belgian commune of Assesse
- Le Hameau, an airfield near Izel-lès-Hameau, France, established by the Royal Flying Corps during the First World War
