= Élysée Palace =

Official residence of the President of France

Coordinates: 48°52′13″N 2°18′59″E

- Palais de l'Élysée
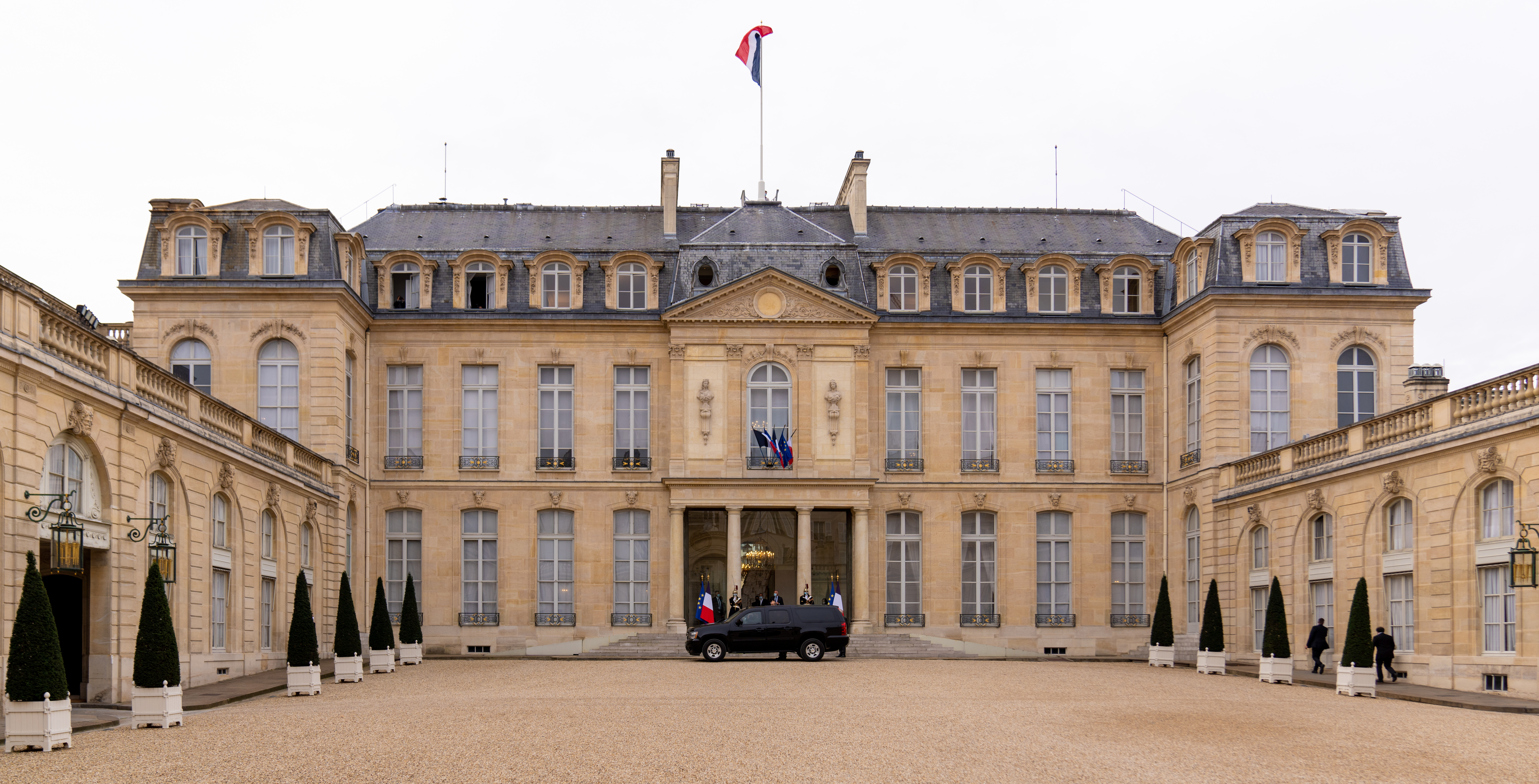
- The northern façade from the cour d'honneur
- Interactive map of the Élysée Palace area
- Former names: Hôtel d'Évreux

General information
- Type: Hôtel particulier
- Architectural style: Built in the 18th century: Classicism, Louis XIV, Louis XV, Baroque, Neo-Classicism; Additions of the 19th century: Empire, Neo-Baroque, Napoleon III
- Location: 55, Rue du Faubourg Saint-Honoré, 75008 Paris, France
- Current tenants: Emmanuel Macron (President of France and Co-prince of Andorra) and his wife, Brigitte Macron
- Construction started: 1718
- Completed: 1722
- Client: Louis Henri de La Tour d'Auvergne, Count of Évreux
- Owner: Government of France

Technical details
- Floor count: 3

Design and construction
- Architect: Armand-Claude Mollet

The Élysée Palace (French: Palais de l'Élysée, pronounced [palɛ d(ə) lelize]) is the official residence of the president of France in Paris. Completed in 1722, it was built for Louis Henri de La Tour d'Auvergne, a nobleman and army officer who had been appointed governor of Île-de-France in 1719. It is located on the Rue du Faubourg Saint-Honoré in the 8th arrondissement, near the Champs-Élysées. The name Élysée derives from the Elysian Fields, the place of the blessed dead in Greek mythology.

The Élysée Palace has been the home of personalities such as Madame de Pompadour (1721–1764), Nicolas Beaujon (1718–1786), Bathilde d'Orléans (1750–1822), Joachim Murat (1767–1815), and Charles Ferdinand, Duke of Berry (1778–1820). On 12 December 1848, under the Second Republic, the French Parliament passed a law declaring the building the official residence of the French president. The Élysée Palace, which contains the presidential office and residence, is also the meeting place of the Council of Ministers, the weekly meeting of the Government of France that is presided over by the president of the Republic. Across the street is the Hôtel de Marigny, which has served as a state guest house where the French government has hosted visiting dignitaries.

== History ==
=== Hôtel d'Évreux ===
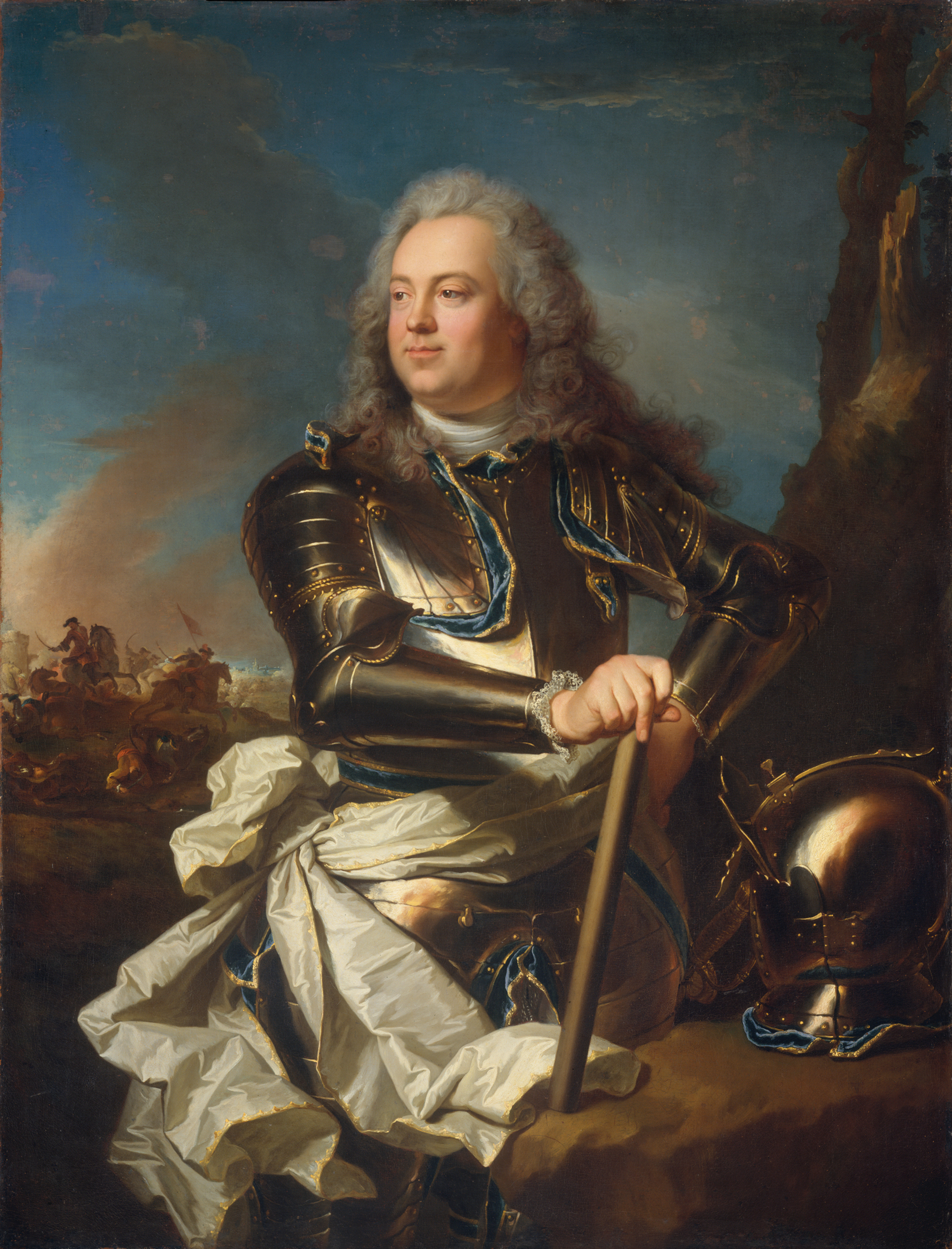
Portrait of the Count of Évreux by Hyacinthe Rigaud, circa 1720

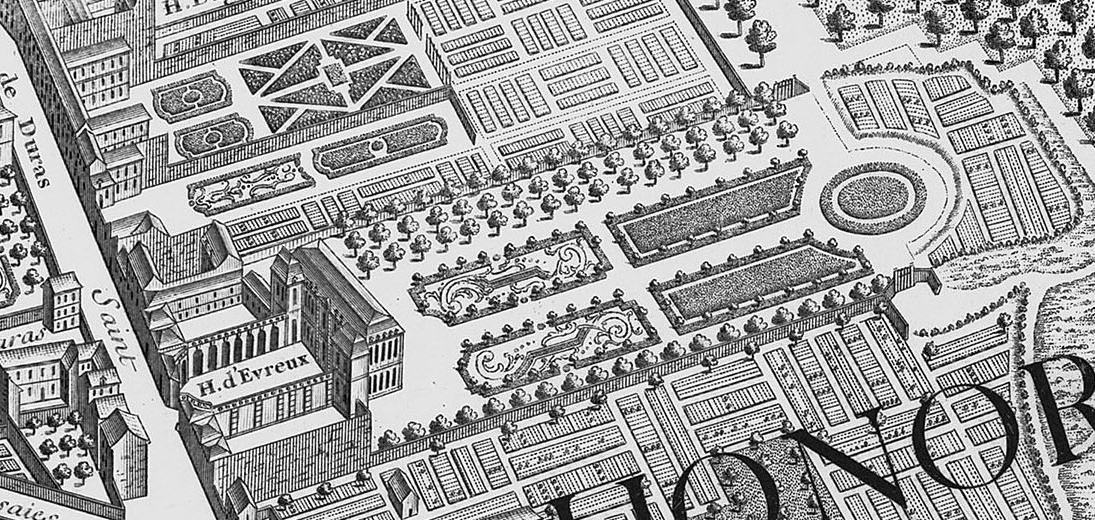
The Hôtel d'Évreux and its gardens, circa 1737

The architect Armand-Claude Mollet possessed a property fronting on the road to the village of Roule, west of Paris (now the Rue du Faubourg Saint-Honoré), and backing onto royal property, the Grand Cours through the Champs-Élysées. He sold this in 1718 to Louis Henri de La Tour d'Auvergne, Count of Évreux, with the agreement that Mollet would construct an hôtel particulier for the count, fronted by an entrance court and backed by a garden.

The construction of the palace was financed by the considerable dowry of 2,000,000 livres received by the Count of Évreux upon his marriage in 1707 to Marie-Anne Crozat, daughter of Antoine Crozat. This Toulouse businessman and shipowner was considered the wealthiest man in France at the beginning of the 18th century. His fortune was built on colonial slavery and the slave trade, particularly through the Compagnie de Guinée.

The Hôtel d'Évreux was finished and decorated by 1722, and though it has undergone many modifications since, it remains a fine example of the French neo-classical style. At the time of his death in 1753, Évreux was the owner of one of the most widely admired houses in Paris, and it was bought by the Marquise de Pompadour on 24 December 1753 for 730,000 livres. Opponents showed their distaste for the regime by hanging signs on the gates that read: "Home of the King's whore". After her death, it was left in her will to the crown.

In 1773, it was purchased by Nicolas Beaujon, banker to the court and one of the richest men in France, who needed a suitably sumptuous "country house" (for the city of Paris did not yet extend this far) to house his fabulous collection of great masters paintings. To this end, he hired the architect Étienne-Louis Boullée to make substantial alterations to the buildings (as well as design an English-style garden). Soon on display there were such well-known masterpieces as Holbein's The Ambassadors (now in the National Gallery in London), and Frans Hals' Bohemian (now at the Louvre). His architectural alterations and art galleries gave this residence international renown as "one of the premier houses of Paris".

=== Royal and imperial palace ===
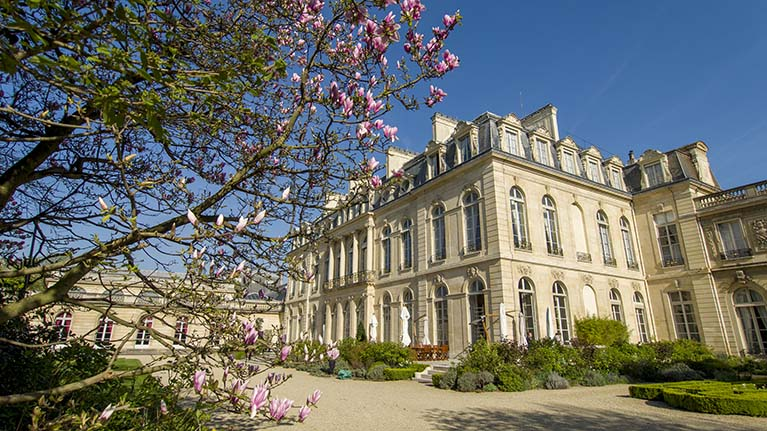
The southern façade seen from the gardens

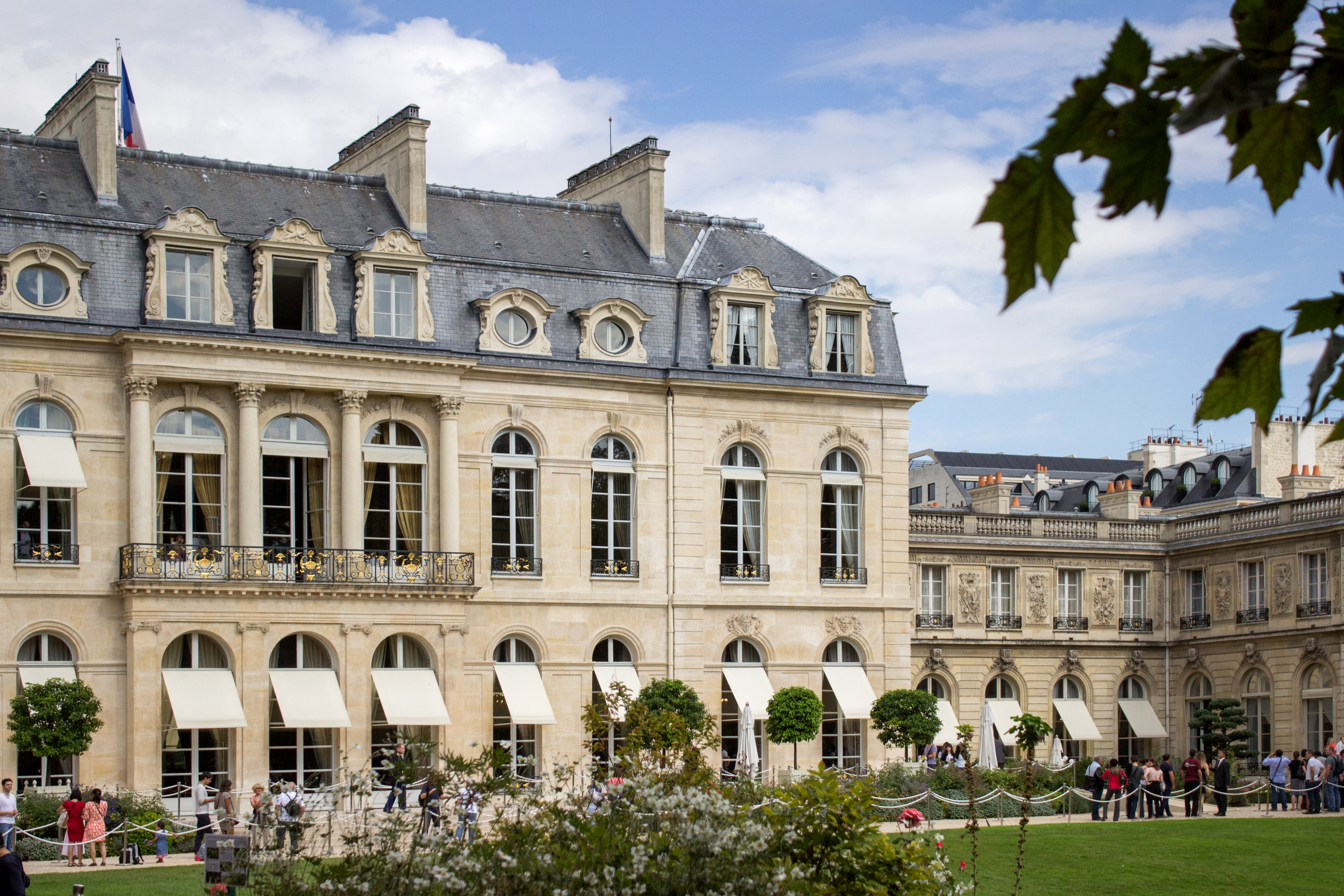
The Élysée Palace seen from the gardens

The palace and gardens were purchased from Beaujon by Bathilde d'Orléans, Duchess of Bourbon in 1787 for 1,300,000 livres. It was the Duchess who named it the Élysée. She also built a group of cottages in the gardens which she named the Hameau de Chantilly, after the Hameau at her father-in-law's Château de Chantilly. With the French Revolution, the Duchess fled the country and the Élysée was confiscated and leased out. The gardens were used for eating, drinking, and dancing, under the name Hameau de Chantilly, and the rooms became gambling houses.

The Élysée was sold in 1805 to Joachim and Caroline Murat, who administered major renovations that made the building more grand and "imperial". Later, the house was transferred to Caroline's brother, Emperor Napoleon, in 1808; it became known as the Élysée-Napoléon. After the Battle of Waterloo, Napoléon returned to the Élysée and signed his abdication there on 22 June 1815. He left the Élysée three days later.

Russian Cossacks camped at the Élysée when they occupied Paris in 1814. The property was then returned to its previous owner, the Duchesse de Bourbon, who then sold it to her royal cousin, Louis XVIII, in 1816. Between 1820 and 1848, the palace was primarily used to host guests of the royal family.

=== Presidential residence ===
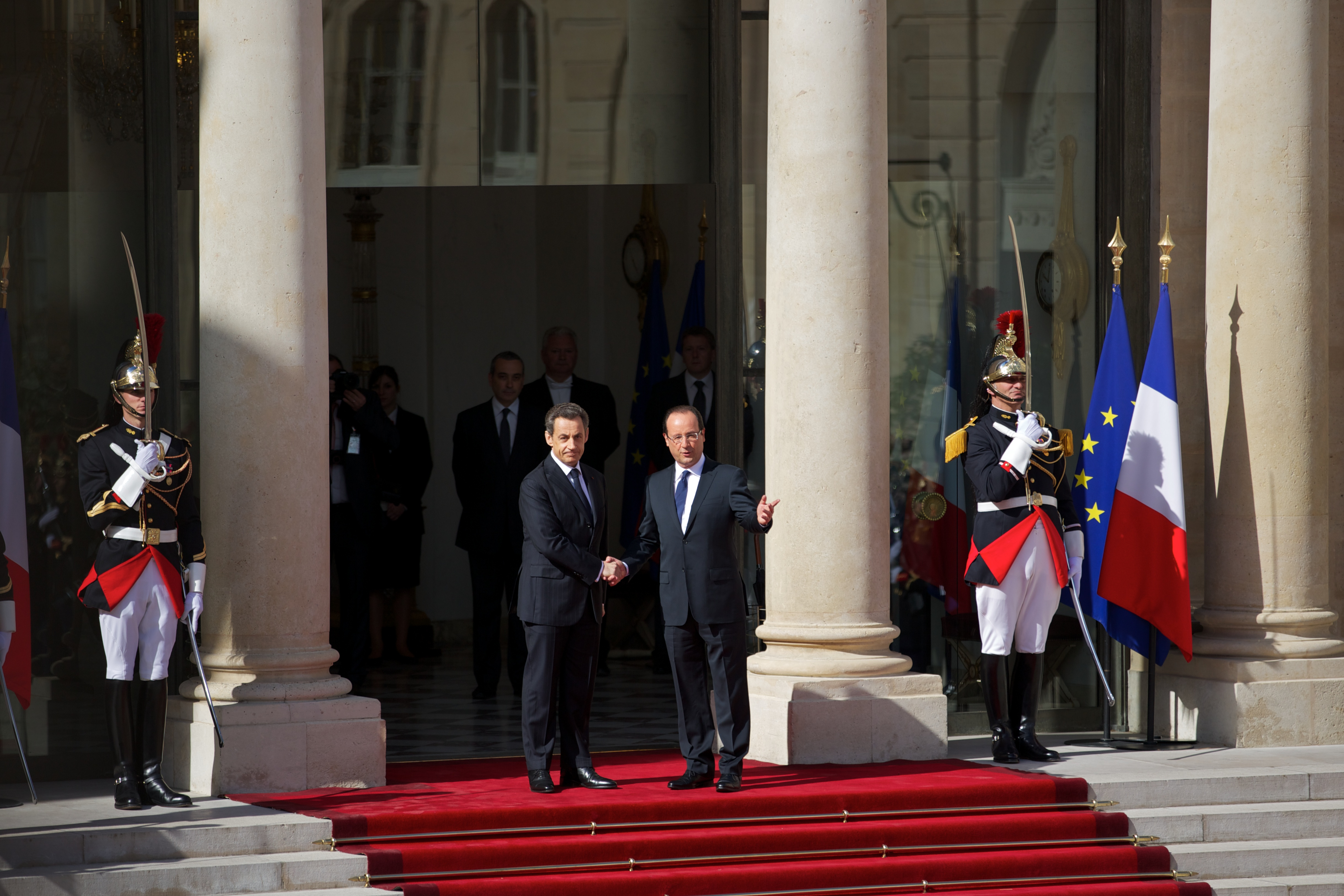
Outgoing president Nicolas Sarkozy and incoming president François Hollande, surrounded by Republican Guards, in the interior court during the ceremony of transmission of the mandate in 2012.

Following the French Revolution of 1848 and the abdication of Louis Philippe I, the provisional government of the Second Republic took over the palace. It was initially used to host musical performances and lectures before being renamed the Élysée National and designated as the official residence of the president of the Republic under the administration of Louis-Napoléon Bonaparte. The president also has the use of other official residences, including the Château de Rambouillet, forty-five kilometres southwest of Paris, as well as the Fort de Brégançon near Toulon.

In 1853, following his coup d'état that ended the Second Republic, Louis-Napoléon Bonaparte, now Napoleon III, tasked architect Joseph-Eugène Lacroix with renovations; meanwhile he moved to the nearby Tuileries Palace, but kept the Élysée as a discreet place to meet his mistresses, moving between the two palaces through a secret underground passage that has since been demolished. Since Lacroix completed his work in 1867, the essential look of the Palais de l'Élysée has remained the same.

In 1873, under the Third Republic, the Élysée became the official presidential residence. In 1899, Félix Faure became the only officeholder to die in the palace.

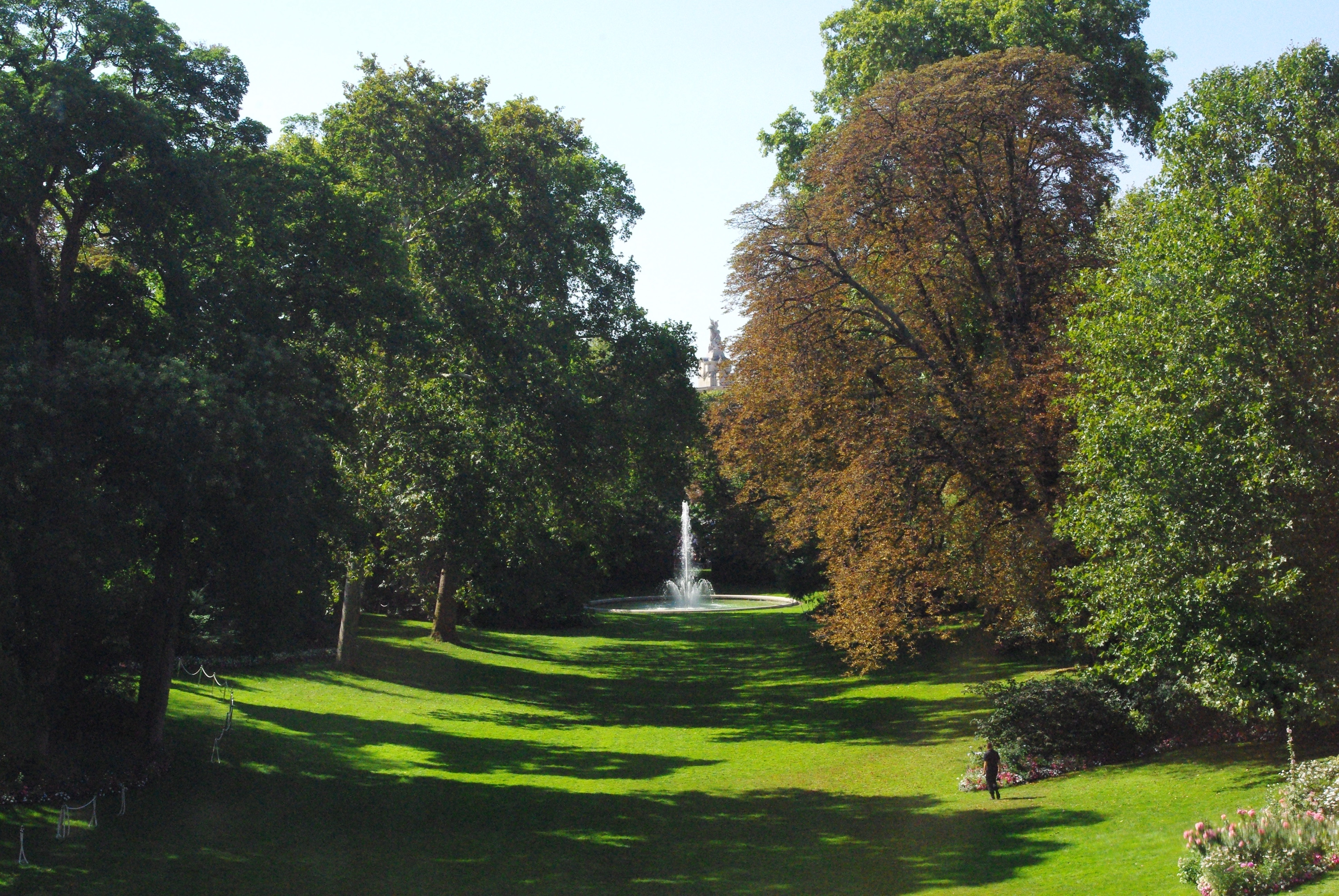
Gardens of the Élysée Palace

In 1917, a chimpanzee escaped from a nearby ménagerie, entered the palace and was said to have tried to haul the wife of President Raymond Poincaré into a tree only to be foiled by Élysée guards. President Paul Deschanel, who resigned in 1920 because of mental illness, was said to have been so impressed by the chimpanzee's feat that, to the alarm of his guests, he took to jumping into trees during state receptions.

The Élysée Palace was closed in June 1940 and remained empty during World War II. It was reoccupied only in 1946 by Vincent Auriol, President of the Provisional Government of the French Republic, then first president of the Fourth Republic from 1947 to 1954. From 1959 to 1969, the Élysée was occupied by Charles de Gaulle, the first president of the Fifth Republic. De Gaulle did not like its lack of privacy and oversaw the purchase of the luxurious Hôtel de Marigny to lodge foreign state officials in visits to France, saying, "I do not like the idea of meeting Kings walking around my corridors in their pyjamas."

In the 1970s, President Georges Pompidou had some of the original rooms in the palace redesigned by Pierre Paulin in the modern style, of which only the Salle à Manger Paulin survives.

Socialist President François Mitterrand, who governed from 1981 to 1995, is said to have seldom used its private apartments, preferring the privacy of his own home on the more bohemian Rive Gauche. A discreet flat in the nearby presidential annexe Palais de l'Alma housed his mistress Anne Pingeot, mother of his illegitimate daughter Mazarine Pingeot.

By contrast, his successor Jacques Chirac lived throughout his two terms in office (1995–2007) in the Élysée apartments with his wife Bernadette. Chirac increased the Palace's budget by 105% to 90 million euros per year, according to the book L'argent caché de l'Élysée. One million euros per year is spent on drinks alone for the guests invited to the Élysée Palace, 6.9 million euros per year on bonuses for presidential staff and 6.1 million euros per year on the 145 extra employees Chirac hired after he was elected in 1995.

The Élysée has gardens, in which presidents hosted parties on the afternoon of Bastille Day until 2010. That year, then-President Nicolas Sarkozy decided to stop organising this event because of France's high debt and the economic crisis.

Emmanuel Macron, the president of France since 2017, currently resides at the palace.

== Description ==
Palais de l'Élysée, Paris.

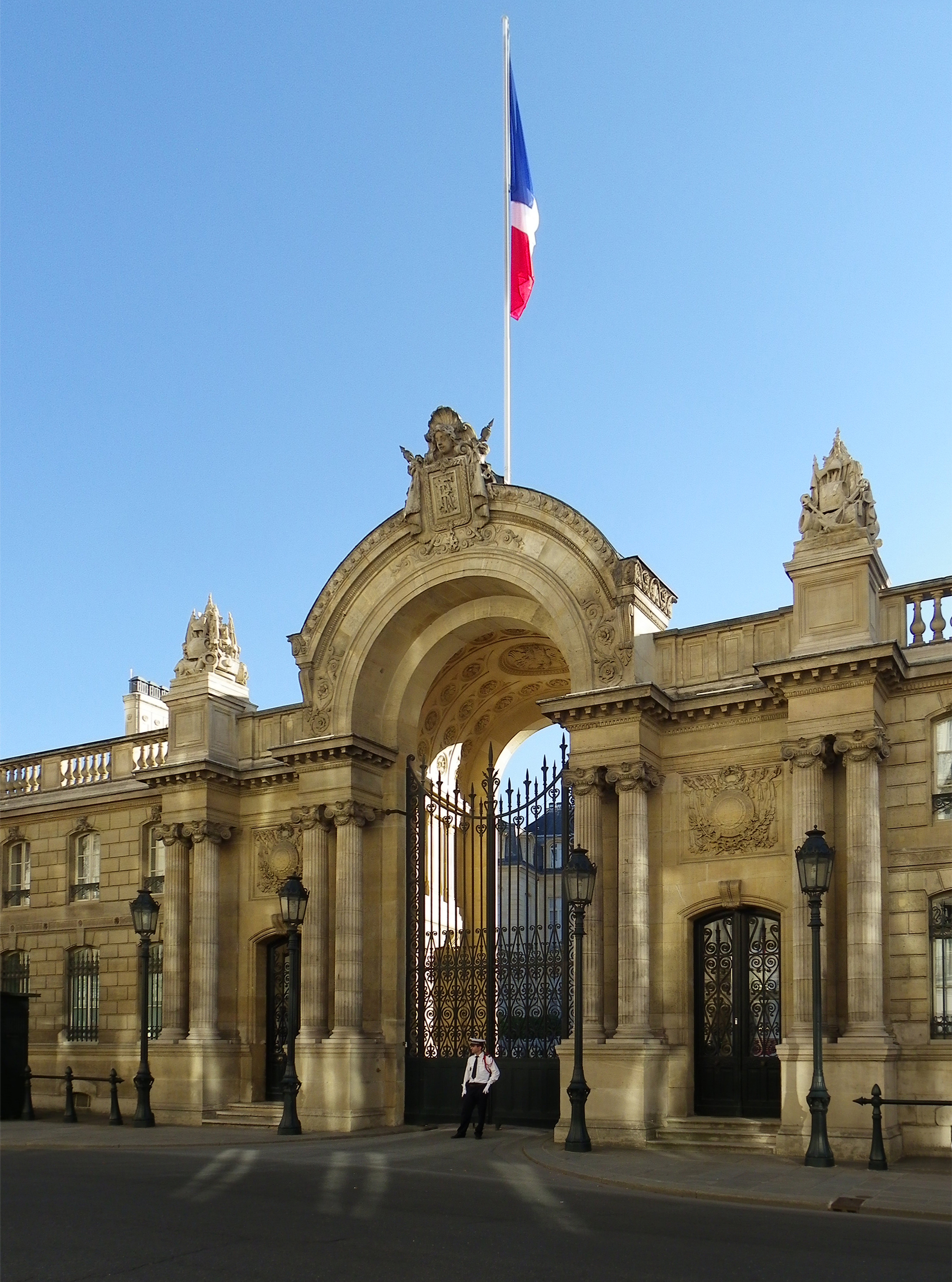
The entrance gate of the Elysée Palace seen from the Rue du Faubourg Saint-Honoré

The heavily guarded mansion and grounds are situated at 55 Rue du Faubourg Saint-Honoré at its intersection with Avenue de Marigny. A monumental gate with four Ionic order columns, flanked by walls topped by a balustrade, opens onto a large rounded courtyard. The majestic ceremonial courtyard imparts a degree of grandeur to the house. The main residence is constructed in the French neo-classical style. An entrance vestibule is aligned with the ceremonial courtyard and gardens. There is a long central building, a great – or state – apartment divided in the middle by a large salon that opens into the garden. This building also has a central three-storey section, and two single-floor wings: the Appartement des Bains to the right, and the Petit Appartement (private apartments) to the left. The French-style garden has a central path aligned with the central building, patterned flowerbeds and alleys of chestnut trees edged with hedgerows.

=== Ground floor ===
Diagram of the ground floor: 1/ Terrasse 2/ Salon d'argent 3/ Salle à Manger 4/ Bibliothèque 5/ Salon bleu 6/ Salon des Cartes 7/ Salle des fêtes 8/ Salon Murat 9/ Salon des Aides de camps 10/ Salon des ambassadeurs 11/ Salon Pompadour 12/ Salon des portraits 13/ Salon Cléopâtre 14/ Escalier Murat 15/ Vestibule d'honneur 16/ Salon des tapisseries 17/ Jardin d'hiver 18/ Salon Napoléon III 19/ Cour d'honneur.

The Vestibule d'Honneur (Hall of Honour) is the room which the main entrance to the palace leads into. In this room the president of France meets visiting officials, world leaders and spiritual leaders.

The Salon d'Argent (Silver Room), in the east wing of the palace, was decorated by Caroline Murat, wife of Joachim Murat and sister of Napoleon I. The room is so called because of the silver coloured edges to the wall features, mantelpieces, tables, sofas, and armchairs, of which the last have swan sculptures at the sides. Three notable historical events happened in this room. On 22 June 1815, Napoleon formally signed his abdication warrant after losing the Battle of Waterloo that year; on 2 December 1851 Louis-Napoléon Bonaparte launched his coup d'état; and in 1899, President Félix Faure met his mistress, Marguerite Steinheil.

The Salle à Manger Paulin (Paulin Dining Room), named after its architect, Pierre Paulin, is a complete contrast to most of the other rooms in the palace. It was designed as a private dining room for President Georges Pompidou and his wife Claude, and the interior and furniture date from the 1970s. The walls are made of 22 polyester panels, the chairs have a single leg attached to a round base, and the round table is made of glass. The room is lit by roof panels decorated with glass balls and rods.

The Salon des Portraits (Portrait Room) was used by the Emperor Napoleon III for portrait medallions of the most important sovereigns of the time, replacing earlier portraits of the Bonaparte family installed by Joachim Murat. The portraits are of: Pope Pius IX, Emperor Franz Josef I of Austria-Hungary, Queen Victoria of the United Kingdom, King Victor Emmanuel II of Italy, Tsar Nicholas I of Russia, King Frederick William IV of Prussia, Queen Isabel II of Spain, and King William I of Württemberg. Previously a dining room, President Nicolas Sarkozy used the room as his second office.

The Salle des Fêtes (Hall of Festivities) dominates the west wing of the palace. It was designed by Eugène Debressenne and opened on 10 May 1889 by the then president, Sadi Carnot, to coincide with the Exposition Universelle that year. The room has paintings on the ceiling called "La République sauvegarde la Paix" (The Republic Safeguards Peace), painted by Guillaume Dubufe in 1894. There are also six Gobelins tapestries in the room, which is predominantly laid out in red and gold decor. In 1984 President François Mitterrand added ten windows to the room to let in more light. It is in this room that all French presidents are inaugurated, and where they host official conferences and banquets.

The Jardins d'Hiver (Winter Gardens) was built in 1883 as a greenhouse for growing plants. Today it is no longer used for this purpose, being instead an extension of the Salon des Fêtes, and used for official banquets. There is a Gobelins tapestry on the wall, and three chandeliers hang from the ceiling.

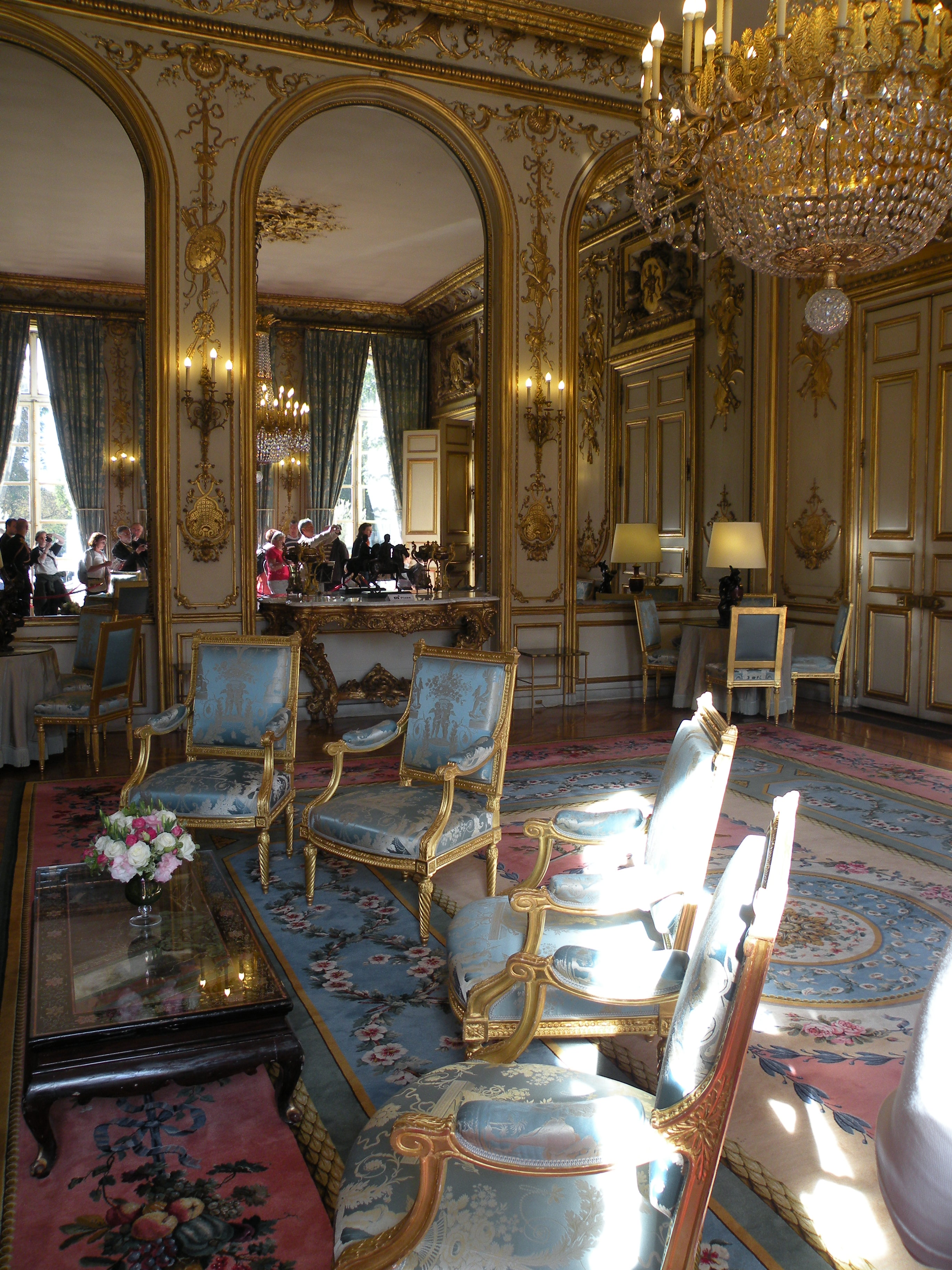
Salon des Ambassadeurs

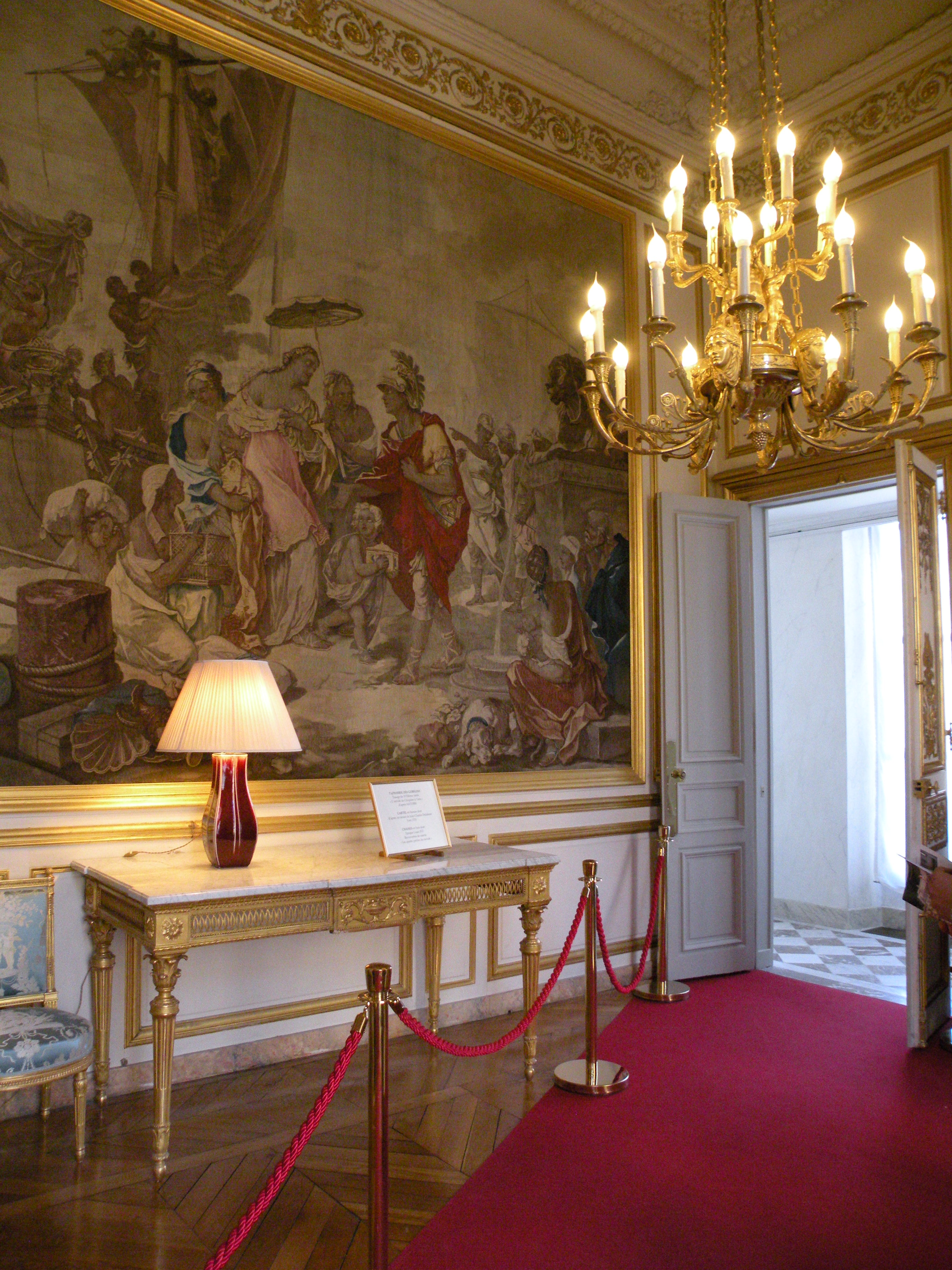
Salon Cléopâtre

The Salon Murat (Murat Room) is used every Wednesday by the president for meetings with the prime minister and the rest of the Government of France, along with the presidential secretary, known as the "Secretary-General of the Élysée". It was also in this room that Konrad Adenauer, Chancellor of Germany, signed the Élysée Treaty in 1963.

The Salon Cléopâtre (Cleopatra Room) gets its name from a Gobelins tapestry on the wall, installed during the presidency of Sadi Carnot, which depicts Antony and Cleopatra meeting at Tarsus. Also in the room is a portrait of Maria Amalia, Duchess of Parma, painted by Alexandre Roslin.

The Salon des Ambassadeurs (Ambassadors' Room) is where the French president officially receives ambassadors from abroad.

The Salon Bleu (Blue Room) is used as the office of the first lady of France.

The Escalier Murat (Murat Staircase) is the main staircase in the palace, linking the ground and first floors.

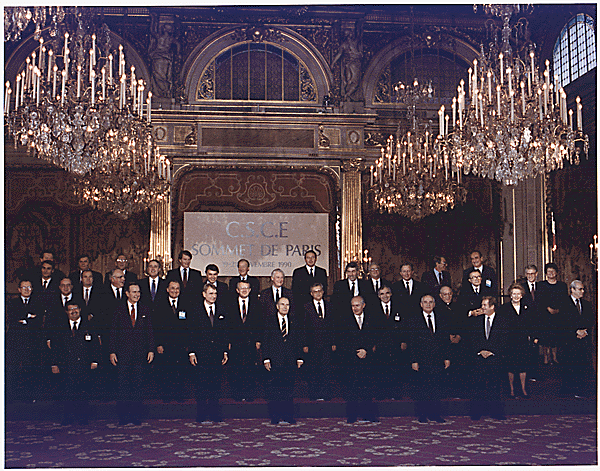
The Salle des Fêtes during the 1990 Conference for Security and Co-operation in Europe conference

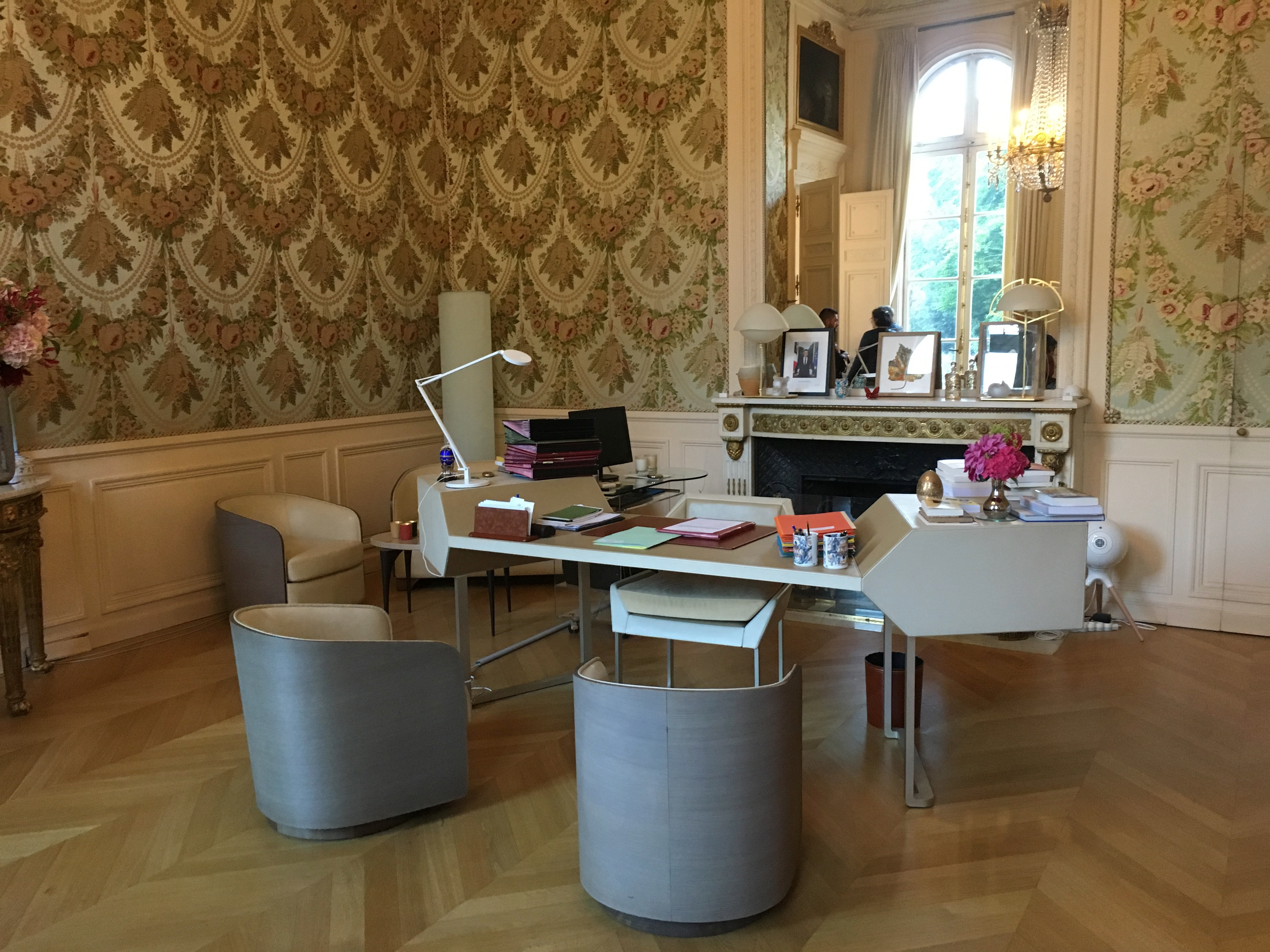
Salon Bleu

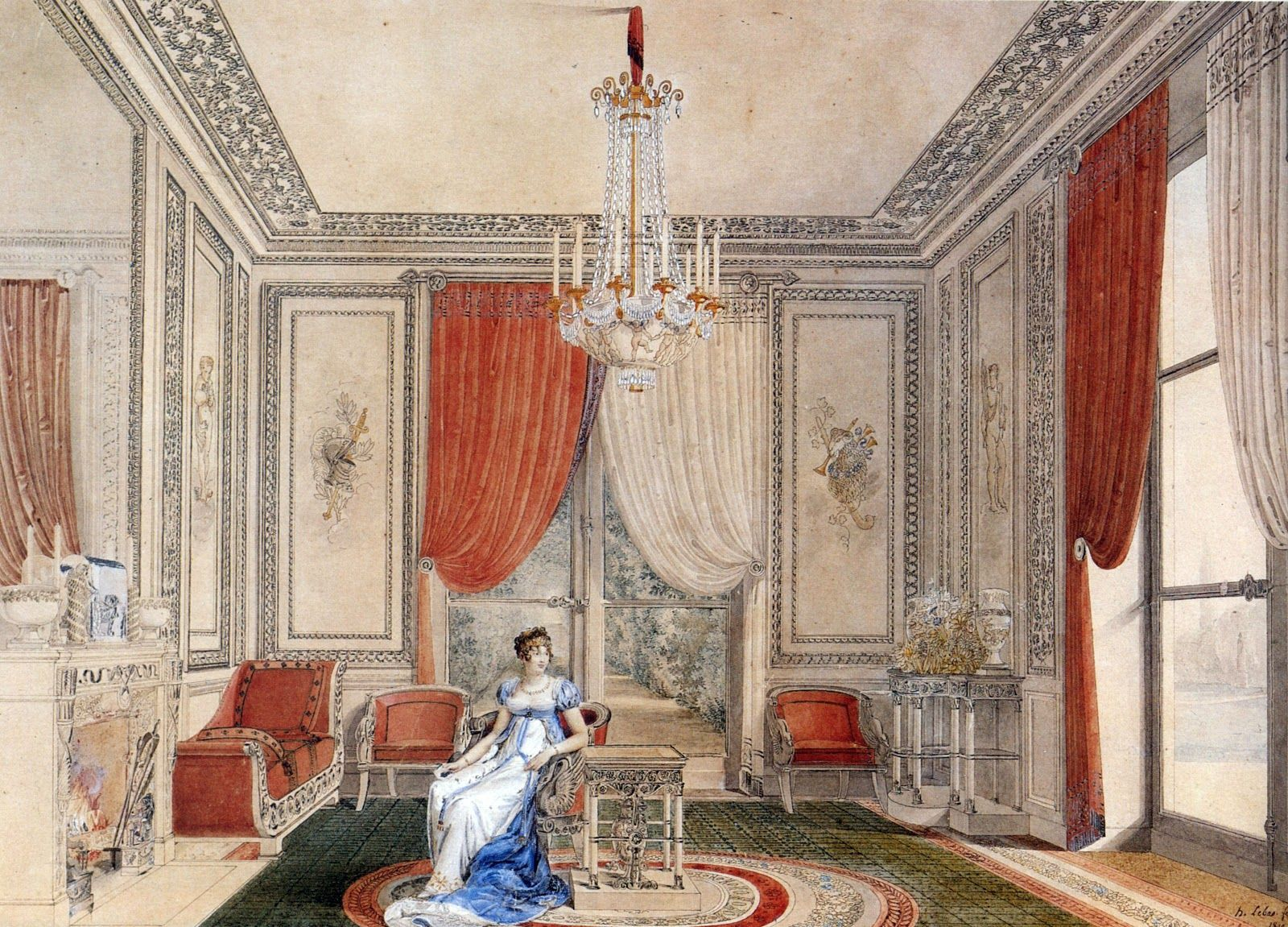
Caroline Murat in the Salon d'Argent, 1810

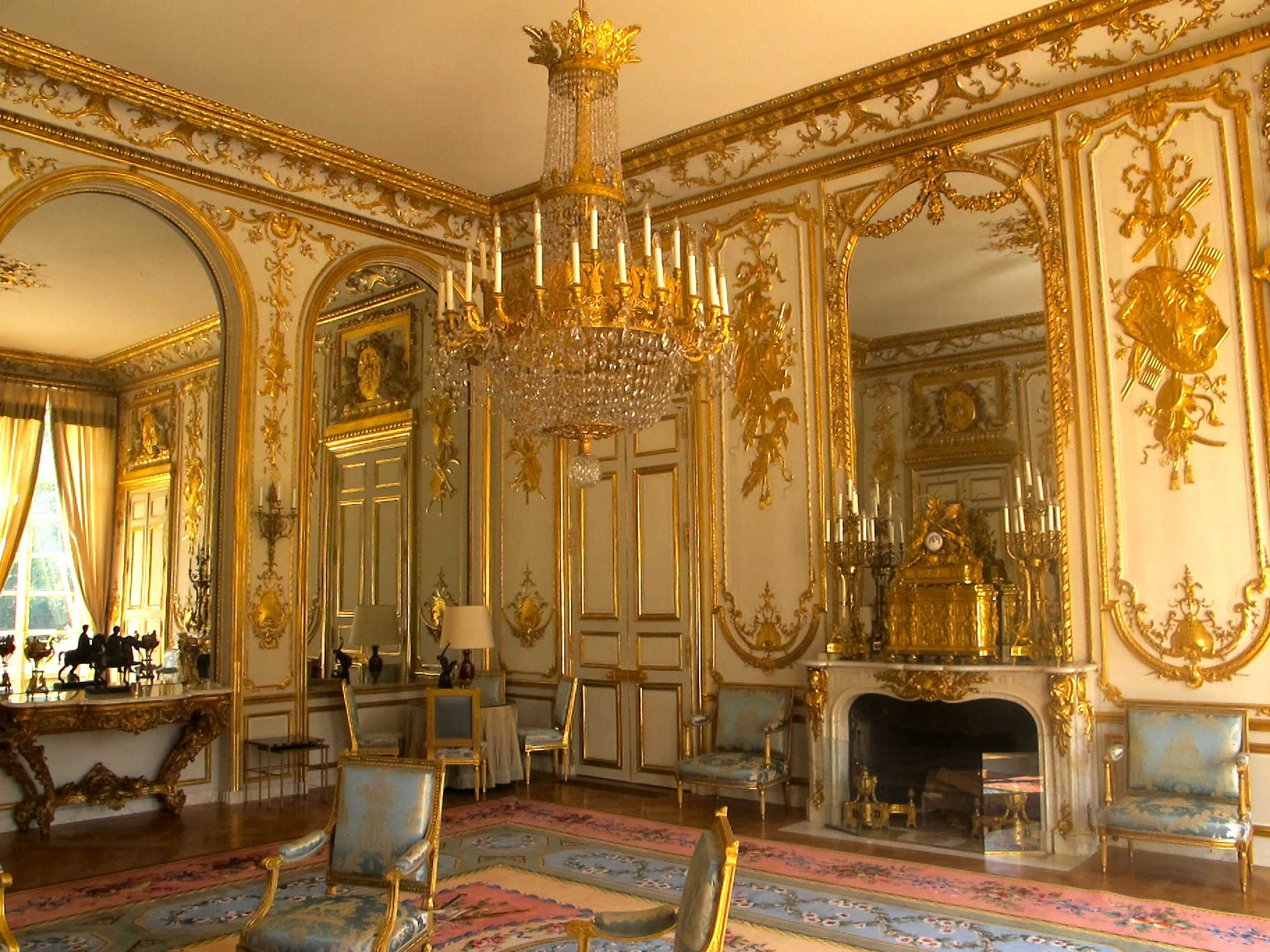
Salon des Ambassadeurs

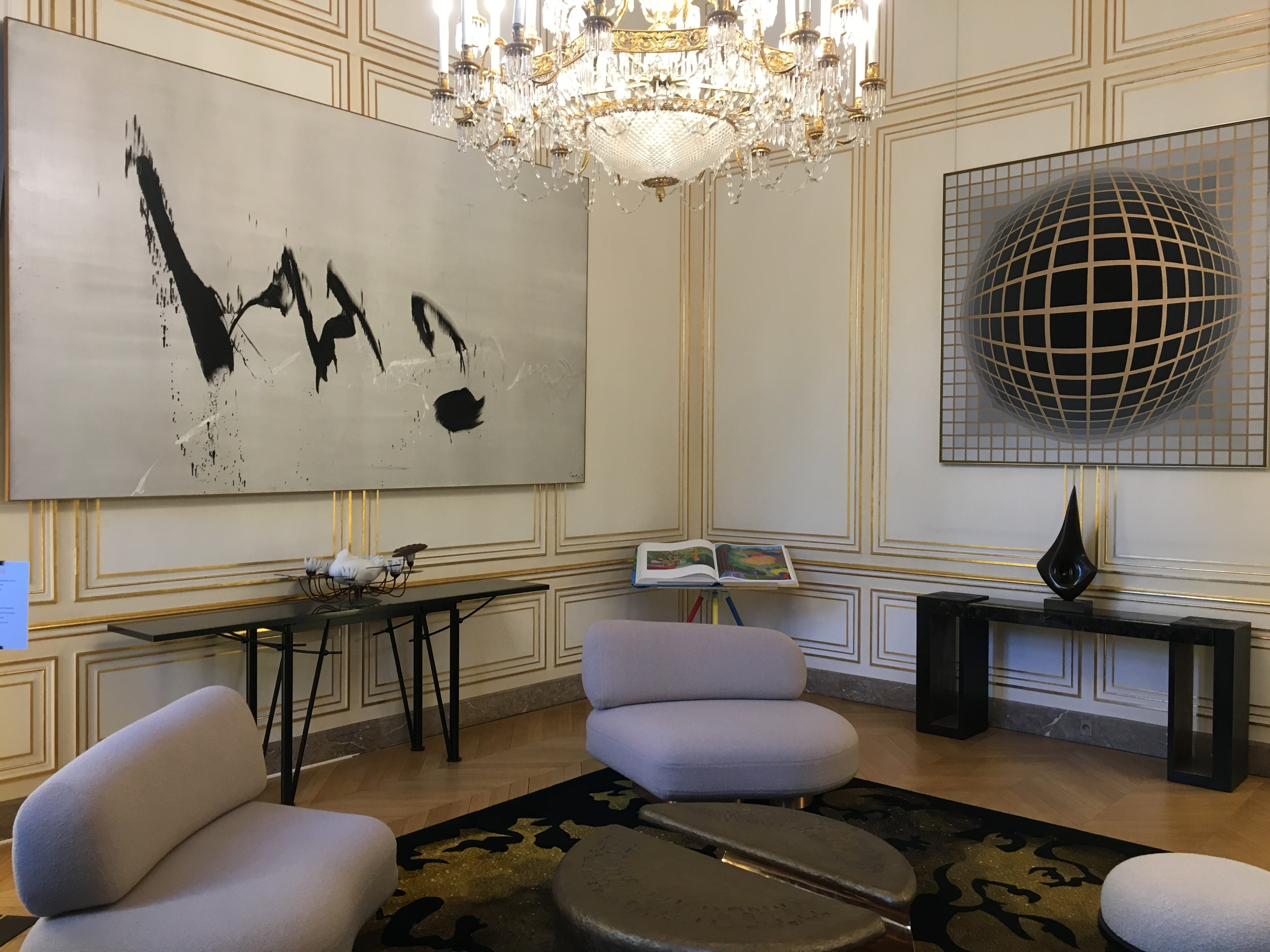
Salon de la Cartographie

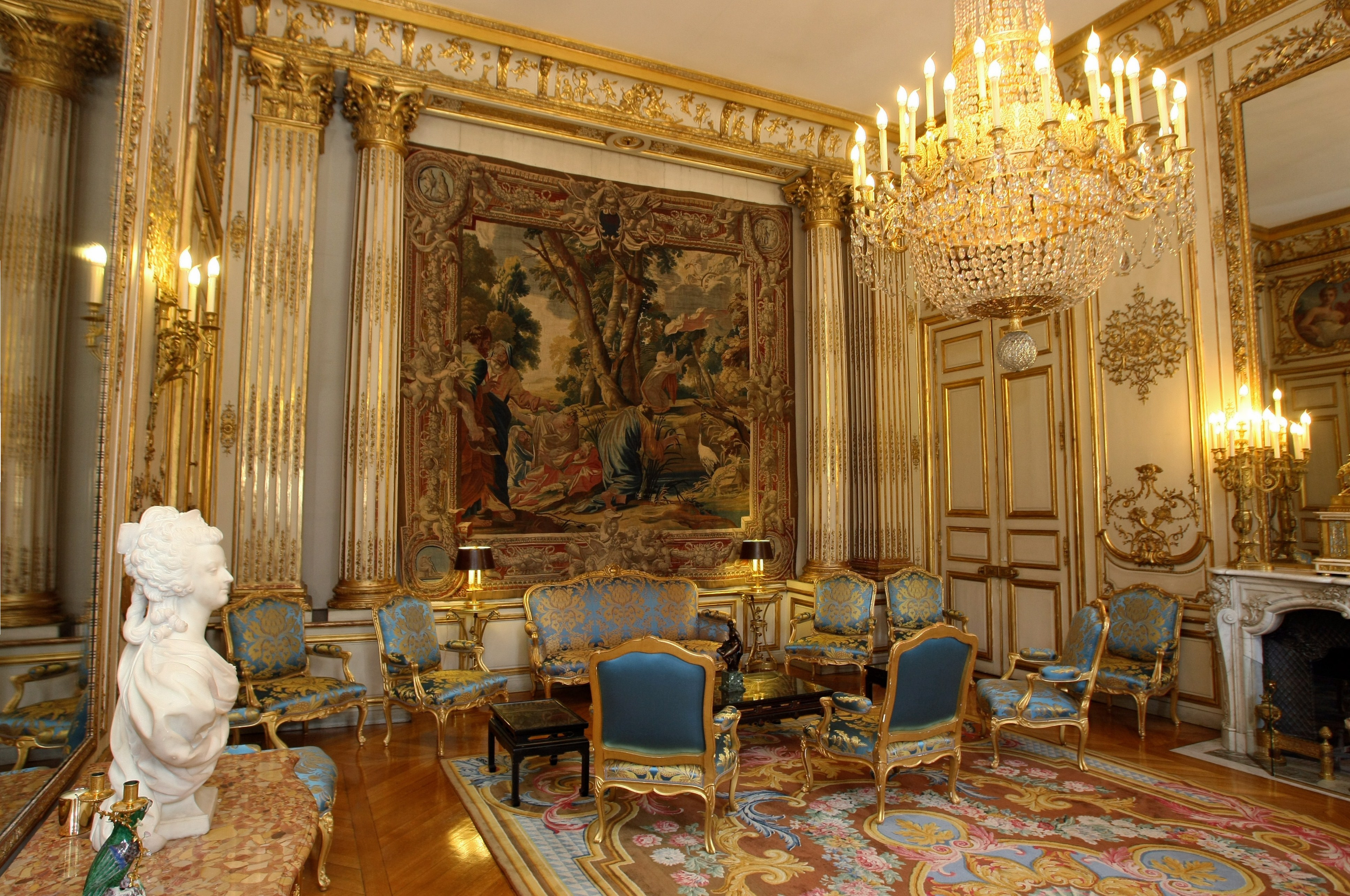
Salon Pompadour

=== First floor ===
The Salon Doré (Golden Room) is named after the gold coloured edges to the wall features, doors, tables, and chairs. All the French presidents have used this room as their main study except Valéry Giscard d'Estaing and Emmanuel Macron.

The Salon Vert (Green Room) is named after the green curtains and chair covers (the doors, chairs, tables, and wall features have gold edges). The room is used for meetings, and it was here that Nicolas Sarkozy married his second wife, Carla Bruni, during his presidency.

The Salon Angle (Angle Room) is a former dining room that has been the office of the Secretary-General of the Élysée since 2007.

The Salon de Fougères (Flower Room) is named because it has floral patterned wallpaper. In the room is a portrait of King Louis XV, painted by Charles-André van Loo.

The Ancienne Chambre de la Reine and the Ancienne Chambre du Roi were the bedrooms of the former Kings and Queens of France. The latter room was formerly used as the office of the Secretary-General before he moved it to the Salon Angle.

Six other rooms on the first floor, in the east wing, are the president's private living quarters.

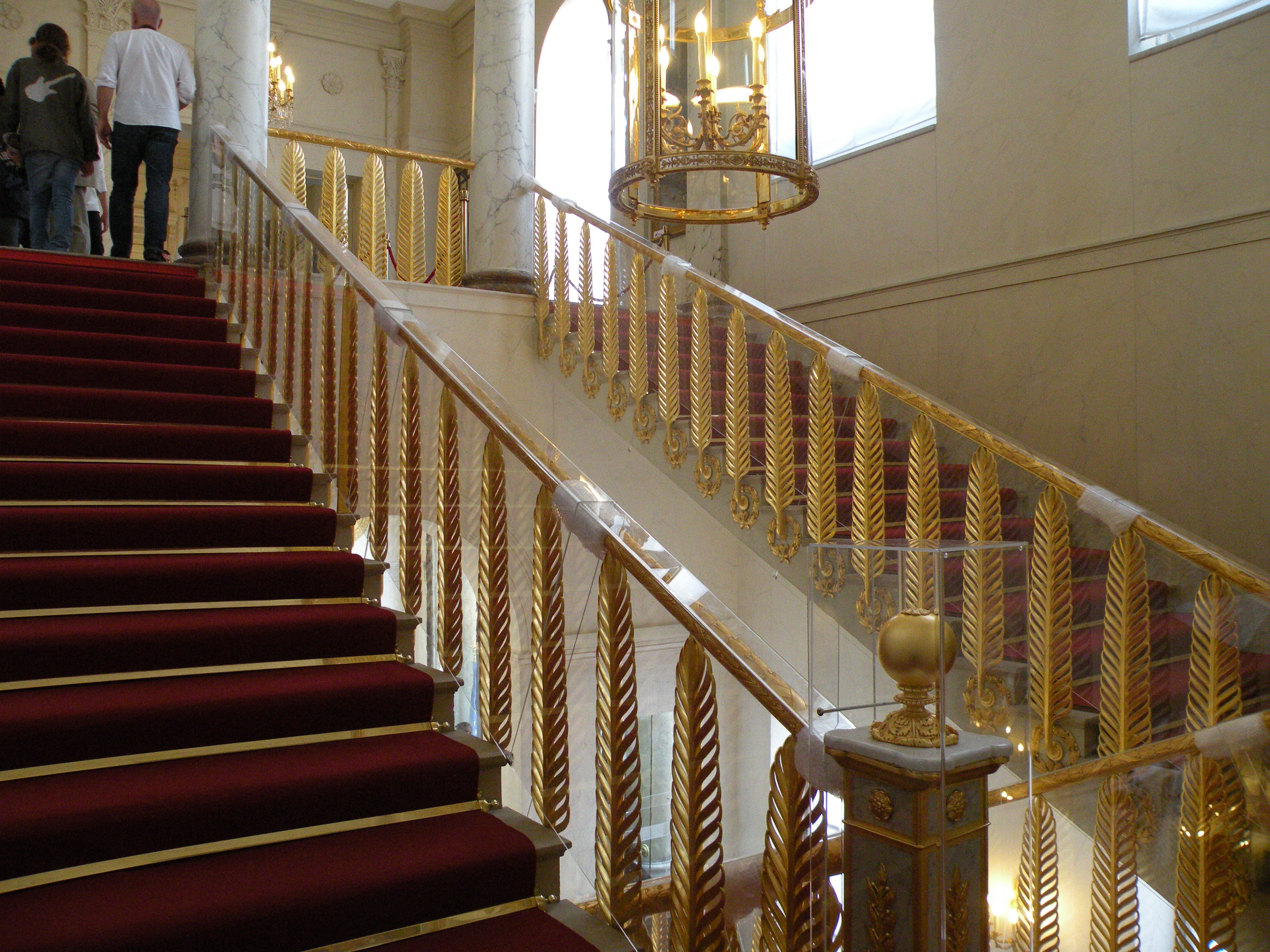
The Escalier Murat, linking the ground and first floors

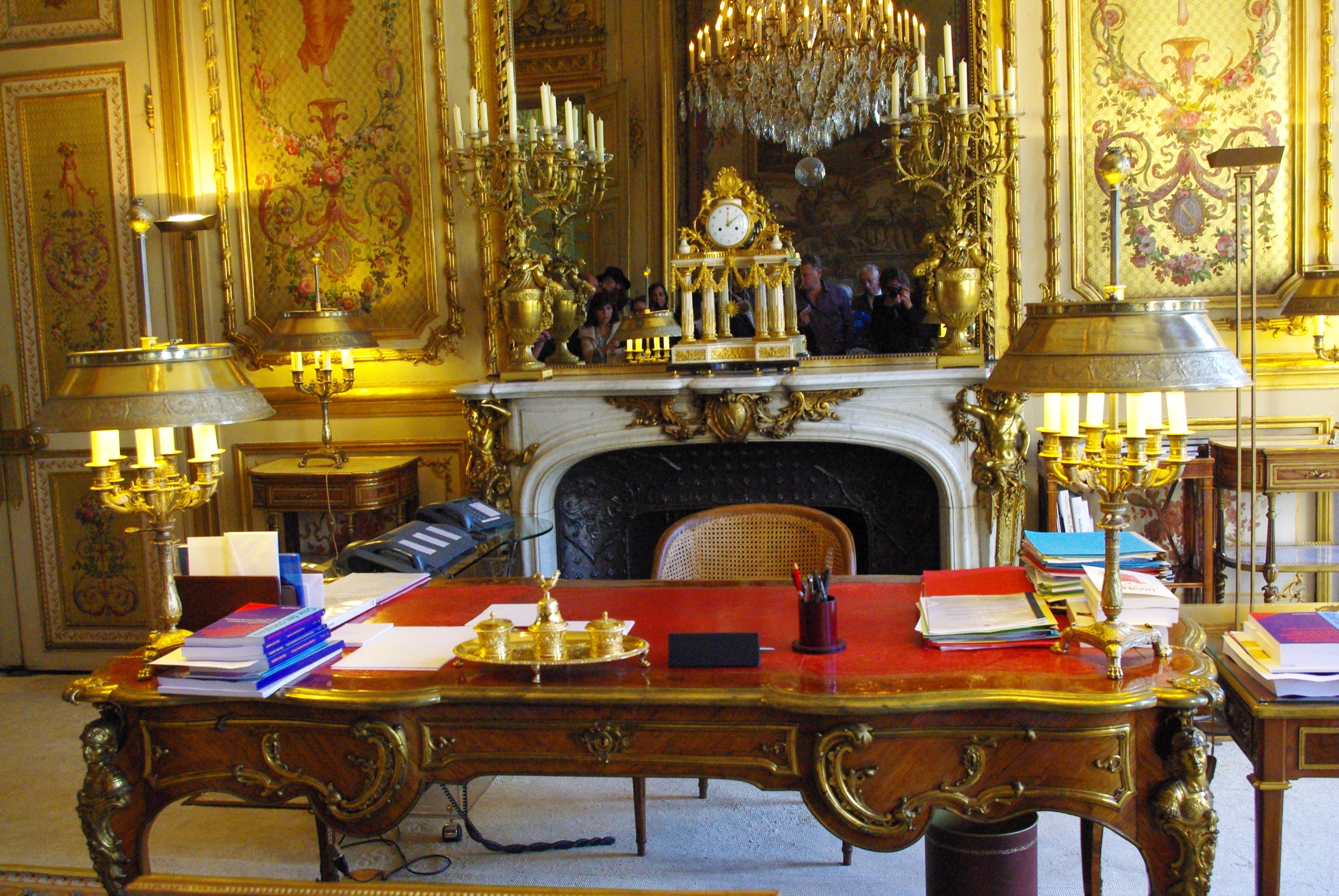
The president's desk in the Salon Doré in 2008, during the presidency of Nicolas Sarkozy

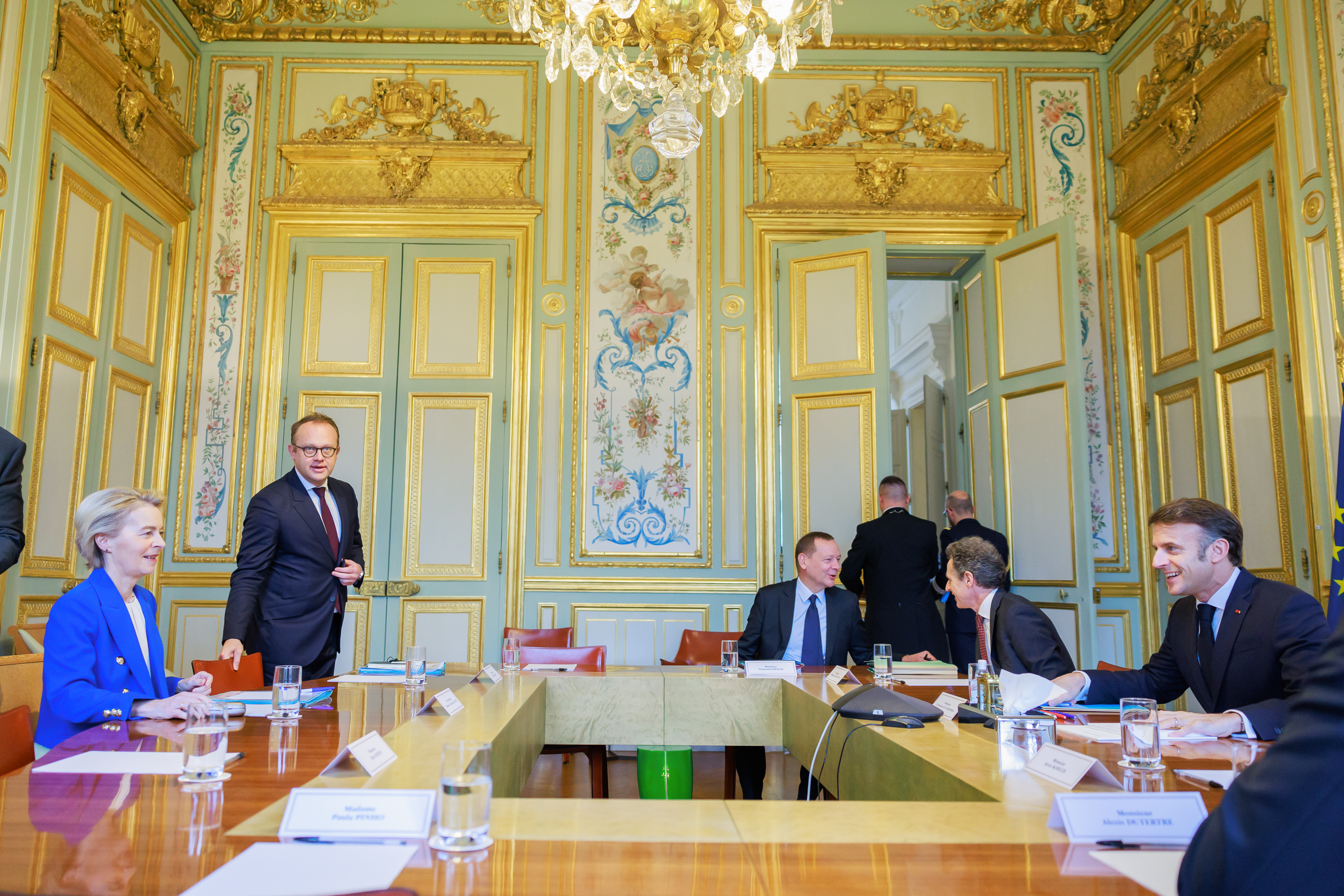
Ursula von der Leyen and Emmanuel Macron in the Salon Vert

== See also ==
- Fort de Brégançon
- La Lanterne, Versailles
- Hôtel Matignon (official residence of the French prime minister)

== Bibliography ==
- René Dosière, L'argent caché de l'Élysée, Seuil, 2007
- Goetz, Adrien (2021). Presidential residences in France. Translated by Dusinberre, Deke. Paris: Flammarion. ISBN 978-2-08-024753-7. OCLC 1235416563.
