= Hameau de Chantilly =

Historic structure in Chantilly, France

Coordinates: 49.194°N 2.494°E

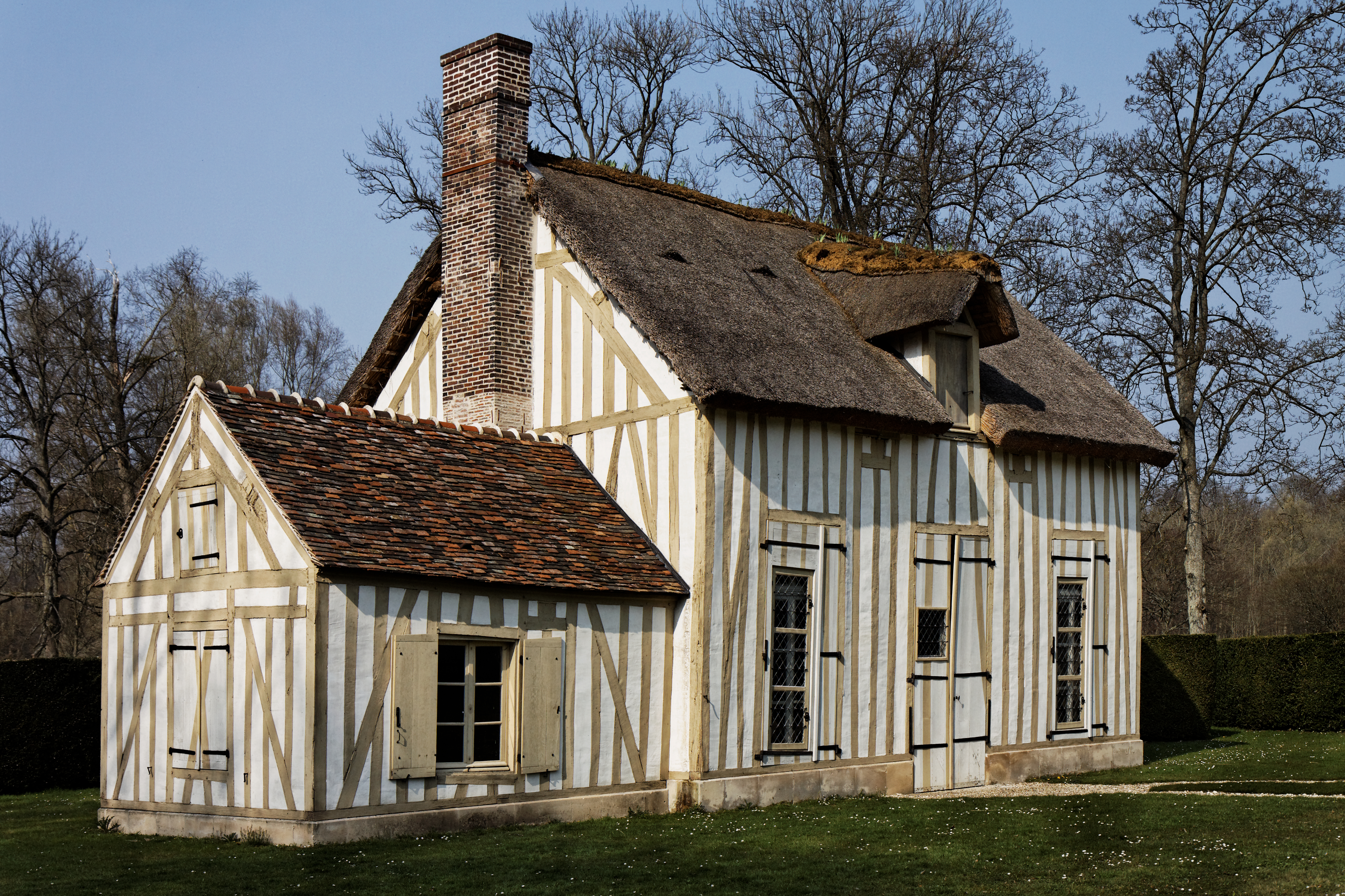
A cottage in the hamlet

The Hameau de Chantilly ('hamlet of Chantilly') is a folly in the park of the Château de Chantilly built in 1774 and consisting of seven rustic thatched cottages with luxurious interiors set in a garden.

Louis Joseph, Prince of Condé had his architect Jean-François Leroy design seven rustic cottages for the grounds of the Château de Chantilly in 1774: le Salon 'the parlor', le Billard 'the billiard room', la Salle à manger 'the dining room', la Cuisine 'the kitchen', le Moulin 'the mill'; l'Étable 'the stables' and le Cabinet de lecture 'the reading room' no longer stand. The contrast between the rustic exteriors and the richly decorated interiors surprised and astonished guests. The success and reputation of this hamlet inspired Queen Marie-Antoinette's Hameau de la reine in the gardens of the Petit Trianon at the Château de Versailles. The Revolution spared the hamlet, which was restored by Henri d'Orléans, Duc d'Aumale when he returned to Chantilly in 1870.

In 2007-2008, the exteriors of the cottages were restored using period watercolors and engravings to guide the work; the original rich interiors, however, had disappeared during the 19th century.

Currently the mill houses a restaurant, Aux Goûters Champêtres.

In 1787, Bathilde d'Orléans, whose main residence was the Château de Chantilly, built a similar hameau in the gardens of the Élysée Palace, the Hameau de Chantilly (Paris).

== See also ==
- Cottage orné
- Ferme ornée
- French landscape garden#The rustic village (hameau) as garden feature
