= Cabinet de lecture =

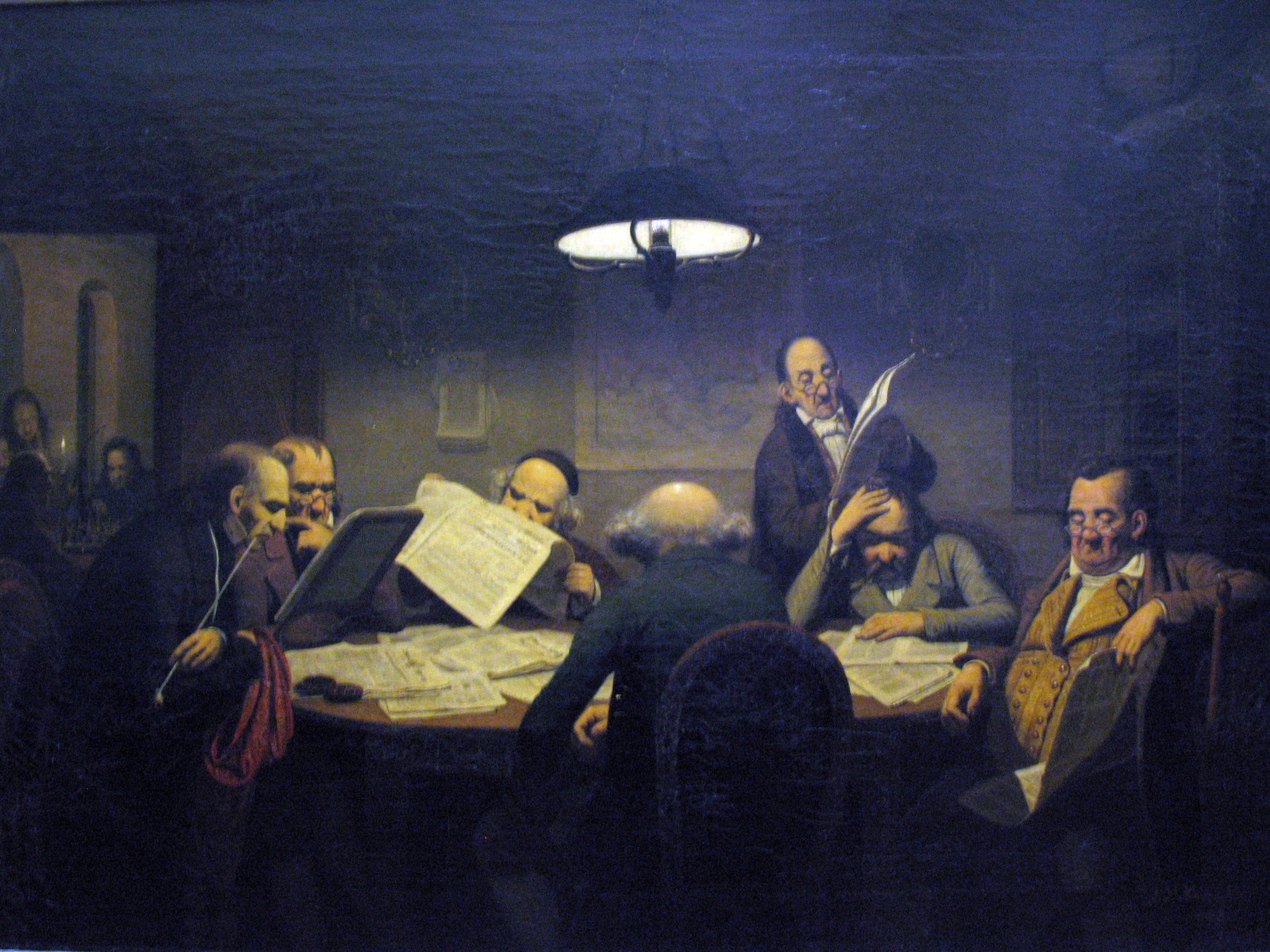
Johann Peter Hasenclever's The Reading Room (1843)

A cabinet de lecture (in English: reading room), sometimes also called a cabinet littéraire, was an establishment where members of the public in the 18th and 19th centuries could, in exchange for a small fee, read public papers, as well as old and new literary works. Individuals were able to hire books by the hour, making cabinets de lecture "precursors of modern libraries and an important and reliable market for books" A monthly subscription to most cabinets de lecture were also available, allowing the subscriber to pay a monthly fee and within that month withdraw as many books from the cabinet de lecture as they desired.

Also known as "literary circles" or "salons," reading rooms allowed the general public not only to read the material found there, but also to take it home. The establishments complemented libraries in that they stocked the daily newspapers, periodicals, pamphlets, novels and other new publications that public libraries lacked. The ‘cabinets de lecture’ also remained open from the morning through to the evening, and so for studious members of the public they offered inexpensive shelter, warmth, light and education.

== The first reading rooms in Paris ==
The number of reading rooms increased as the desire to read and study politics spread. Before the Revolution, there were only book lenders, somewhere to add books to a collection but not somewhere the public went to read. The reader had to pay a small fee as an insurance against the book which they were taking away. This cost was too expensive for most people and therefore alienated many readers. With the development of reading rooms, it became possible, for a small amount of money, to spend the whole day in a well-decorated, heated, and lit room, whilst having at your disposal the necessary books for serious study or mental development. In many reading rooms, the clientele consisted mostly of literate individuals who were unable to purchase books and periodicals on a regular basis. This clientele included professionals, teachers, skilled artisans, and small merchants.

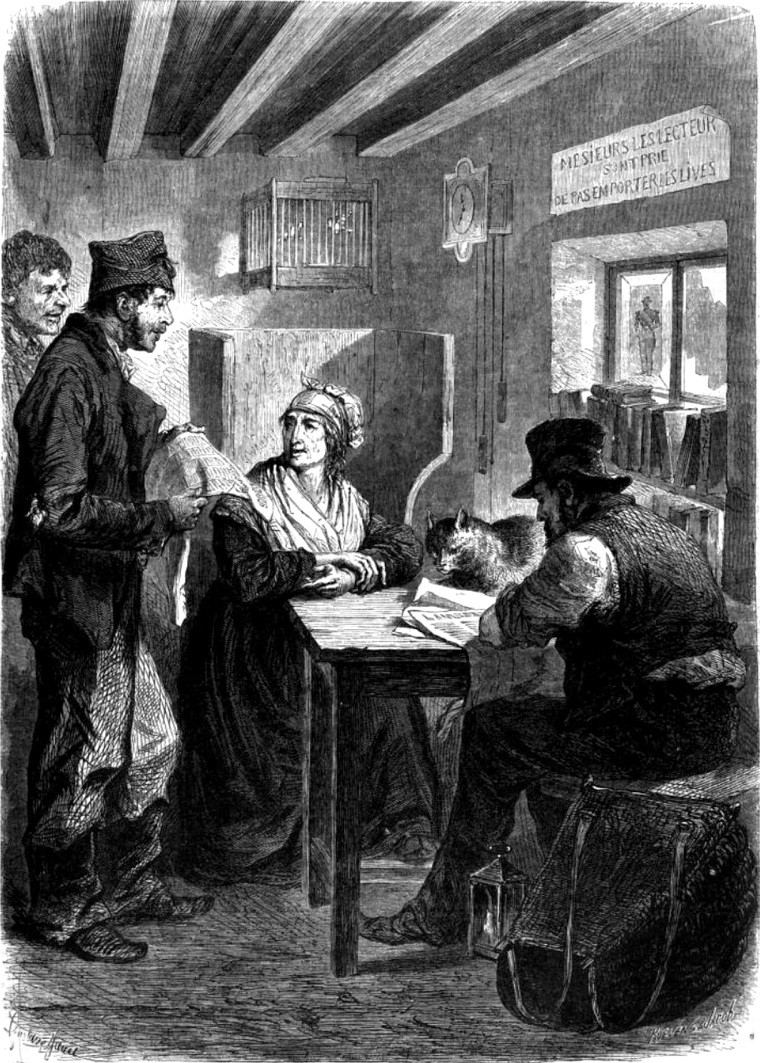
Cabinet de lecture des chiffonniers de Madame Lecœur (Cité Doré). (English: The Cabinet des chiffoniers (Cité Doré) of Madame Lecœur.) The sign above the window reads: ‘Gentlemen, readers are asked not to take the books out of the reading room.’ Etching by Gustave Janet after Charles Yriarte

Following the French Revolution, cabinets de lecture grew hugely in popularity. As well as attending French political societies (known as clubs), those involved in politics would also visit the cabinets, where – for a small fee – they were able to read newspapers and pamphlets in small booths, or the wide array of newly published pieces of literature that were spread over the tables. Often at the cabinets, as with at the clubs, coffee houses, salons and bookshops, serious discussions would break out. People argued, hurled abuse and fought one another over specific facts in order to attack or defend the public figures being discussed. Whether by the light of a lantern or a simple oil lamp, people came to feed their political appetite and to leave better prepared for the debates that took place in the street. For this reason, the majority of the cabinets were located at the Palais-Royal in central Paris. Among them was Gattey’s, which published Rivarol and Champcenetz's satirical, anti-revolutionary pamphlet, Les Actes des Apôtres (in English: The Acts of the Apostles). Bravely, Gattey kept his establishment open during the Revolution, despite the dangerous name with which his cabinet was often associated: “The Aristocrats’ Den”.

== Opening a cabinet de lecture ==
During the First Empire and the Restoration periods in France there were several laws regarding the regulation of book trade, printing, and the press. These laws required booksellers to be licensed and officially sworn. Cabinets de lecture, however, didn't require a license in order to operate. A person who wanted to own a cabinet de lecture only needed to be issued an authorization to do so, after making a payment. It was also required that there be evidence of good moral character, financial responsibility, and the need for a cabinet de lecture in the community. A request to open a cabinet de lecture could be refused on the grounds that the directeur-général believed there to be too many cabinets de lecture in the area already.

== Decline of the cabinet de lecture ==
There were many variables that contributed to the decline of the cabinet de lecture, which occurred around 1850. There were numerous complaints in the early to mid-1800s that cabinets de lecture were, by their very existence, ruining the bookselling trade, and that cabinets de lecture were "establishments [that] provided an outlet for works of most dubious quality, often written by venomous hacks and read by envious idlers." More attacks on the characters of cabinets de lecture were made by various booksellers in this period, and it is likely that these remarks grew from the conflict between such booksellers and the establishments that threatened their livelihood.

But such a remark was not entirely baseless. There was a growing difference between the editions of books found in cabinets de lecture, and the original editions. These editions were usually published in octavo, with several volumes per title, and often contained white spaces and even blank pages, making the volumes appear more substantial than they actually were.

Another development that contributed to the decline of the cabinet de lecture was the increase cheaply created and cheaply sold literature. Emile de Girardin founded the Presse, a cheap, popular press in 1836, and Gervais Charpentier created a series of works in small volumes which sold for F 3.50. Because of the low price of such publications, they could be easily purchased by people from any walk of life, and as cheap papers and affordable serialized novels became more popular, cabinets de lecture became obsolete.

== Sources ==
- Gustave Fustier, Le Livre, Paris, A. Quantin, 1883, p. 430-7.
- William Duckett fils, Dictionnaire de la conversation et de la lecture, tome 4, Paris, Didot, 1873, p. 137.
- Artaud de Montor, Encyclopédie des gens du monde, tome 4, Paris, Treuttel et Würtz, 1834, p. 413.
