= Hameau de la Reine =

Marie Antoinette's model village

Coordinates: 48.818747°N 2.112916°E

Maison de la reine and the Tour de Marlborough (left) in the hameau at the Petit Trianon park of Versailles

The Hameau de la Reine (French pronunciation: [amo də la ʁɛn], The Queen's Hamlet) is a rustic retreat in the park of the Château de Versailles built for Marie Antoinette in 1783 near the Petit Trianon in Yvelines, France. It served as a private meeting place for the queen and her closest friends and as a place of leisure. Designed by Richard Mique, the queen's favoured architect, with the help of the painter Hubert Robert, it contained a meadowland with a lake and various buildings in a rustic or vernacular style, inspired by Norman or Flemish design, situated around an irregular pond fed by a stream that turned a mill wheel. The building scheme included a farmhouse (the farm was to produce milk and eggs for the queen), a dairy, a dovecote, a boudoir, a barn that burned down during the French Revolution, a mill and a tower in the form of a lighthouse. Each building is decorated with a garden, an orchard or a flower garden. The largest and most famous of these houses is the "Queen's House", connected to the Billiard house by a wooden gallery, at the center of the village. A working farm was close to the idyllic, fantasy-like setting of the Queen's Hamlet.

The hameau is the best-known of a series of rustic garden constructions built in this era, notably the Prince of Condé's Hameau de Chantilly (1774–1775) which was the inspiration for the Versailles hamlet. Such model farms, operating under principles espoused by the Physiocrats, were fashionable among the French aristocracy at the time. One primary purpose of the hameau was to add to the ambiance of the Petit Trianon, giving the illusion that it was deep in the countryside rather than within the confines of Versailles. The rooms at the hameau allowed for more intimacy than the grand salons at Versailles or at the Petit Trianon.

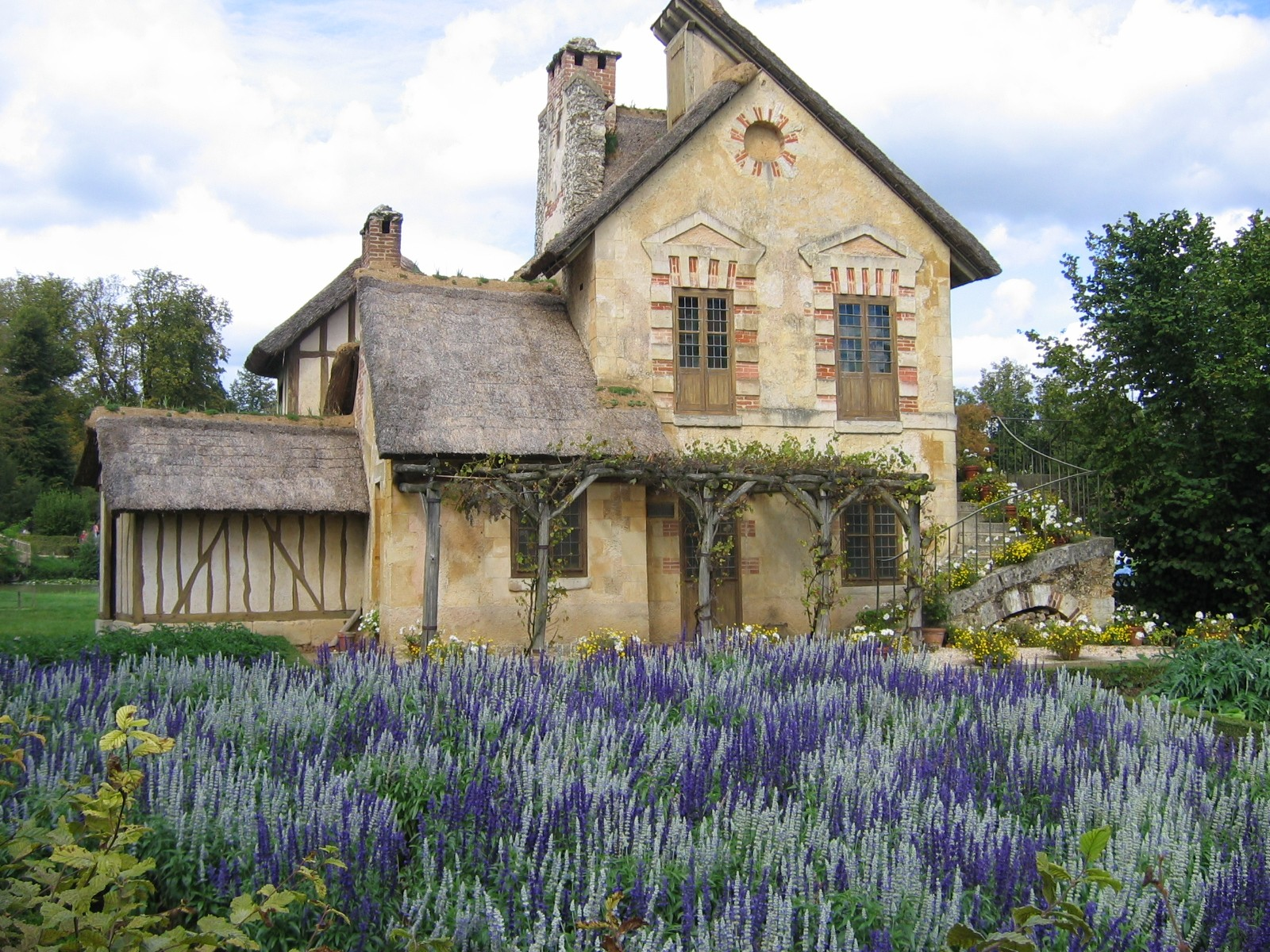
Back of the Moulin, the watermill cottage built for Marie Antoinette

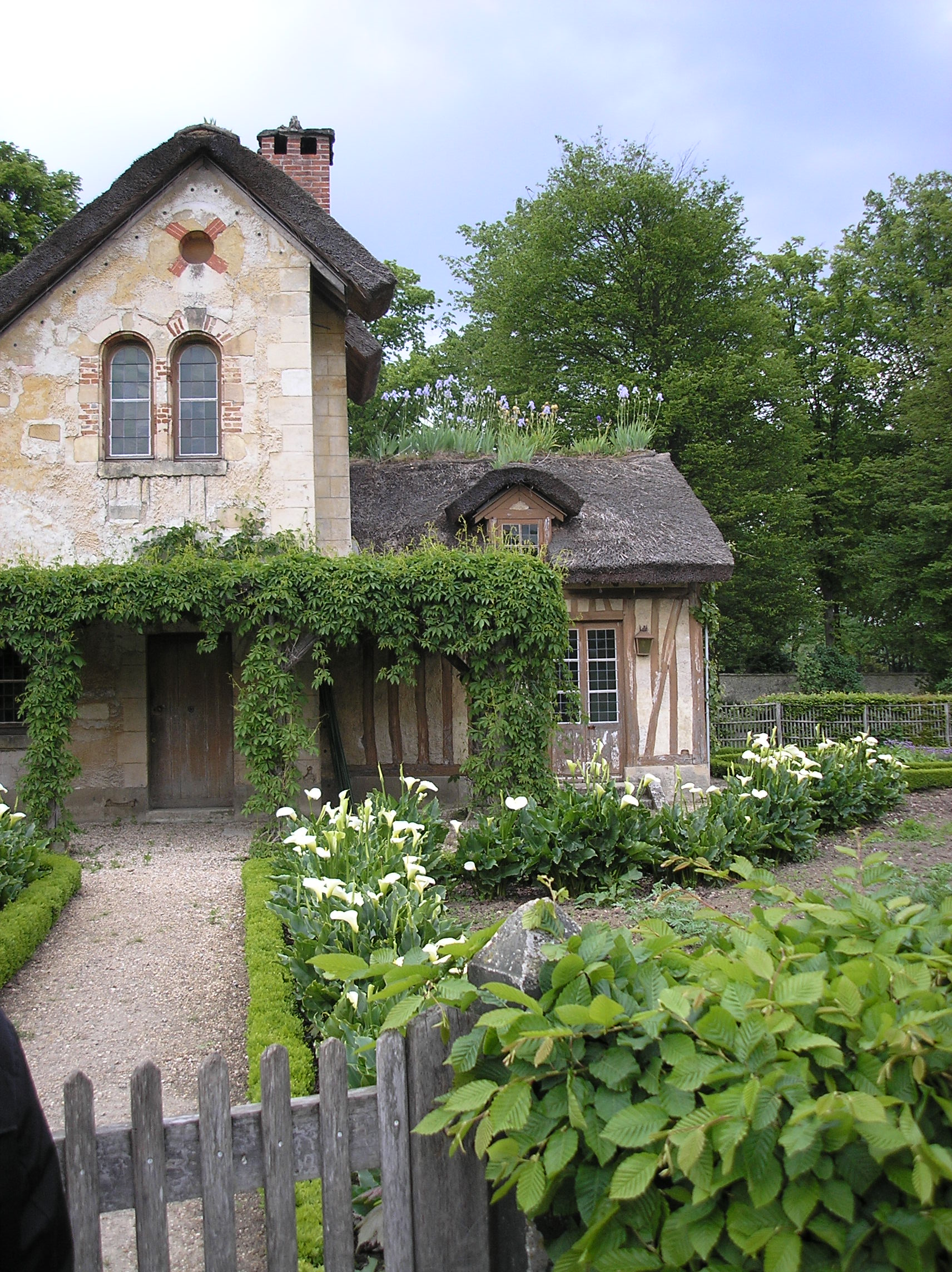
A "cottage garden"

Abandoned after the French Revolution, it was first renovated under Napoleon I, then in the 1930s and again in late 1990. Buildings are still being periodically renovated to this day. Currently, it is open to the public.

== History and construction ==
Inspired by a wave of naturalism in art, architecture, and garden design, the Hameau de la Reine was constructed from 1783 to 1786. The garden surroundings of the Petit Trianon, of which the hameau de la Reine is an extension, began their transformation from formal pattern gardens. Under Louis XV it had been an arboretum and the new arrangements eliminated this famous botanical garden, replacing it with a more informal "natural" garden of winding paths, curving canals and lakes under the direction of Antoine Richard, gardener to the queen. Richard Mique modified the landscape design to provide vistas of lawn to west and north of the Petit Trianon, encircled by belts of trees. Beyond the lake to the north, the hameau was sited like a garden stage set, initially inspired in its grouping and vernacular building by Dutch and Flemish genre paintings, philosophically influenced by Rousseau's cult of "nature", and reflecting exactly contemporary picturesque garden principles set forth by Claude-Henri Watelet and by ideas of the philosophes, their "radical notions co-opted into innocent forms of pleasure and ingenious decoration" as William Adams has pointed out. Artists played a more direct role in French picturesque than they probably had done in England, as can be seen by Hubert Robert's involvement.

=== Stylistic influence and prototypes ===
The stylistic design of the Hameau de la Reine was influenced by the Hameau de Chantilly, a similarly rustic "village" with half-timbered façades and reed-thatched roofs. A wave of naturalism and an affinity towards the "simple" life was sweeping across France in the 18th century. French aristocrats loved to act like shepherds and shepherdesses, while still enjoying the comforts of their social position. This idealism of the natural life came from the extremely influential works of Jean Jacques Rousseau, who emphasized Nature. The hamlet seemed completely rustic and natural from the outside, while the Rococo interior provided the desired comfort and luxury of the queen and her friends.

=== Construction and architectural design ===
The Petit Trianon, originally built for Madame de Pompadour under the reign of Louis XV, was a private domain. Encircling the Petit Trianon was the Jardin Anglais (the English Garden), a wilder style of garden that arose in response to traditional French manicured gardens. The Hamlet is built in a hybrid architectural style. A combination of Norman, Flemish, and French styles came together to create the village full of sylvan charm. Typically Norman, the cottages have half-timbered façades and reed coverings. The brick, "sparrow-stepped" gables and the stained glass windows are distinctly Flemish. The roofs covered with dormer windows and the plaster-covered façades, though, were native to France. The French architect Richard Mique designed and built the Hamlet with the garden in mind, and it is almost an extension of the Jardin Anglais. His buildings lend themselves to the surrounding landscape in their arrangement around a small lake, giving the illusion of a perfect and functioning village.

The barn, occasionally used as a ballroom, and the Preparation Dairy, were among the most damaged constructions of the hamlet after it was neglected during the French Revolution. Napoleon I decided to demolish these two buildings while he had the rest of the hamlet renovated from 1810 to 1812.

=== Life at the Queen’s Hamlet ===
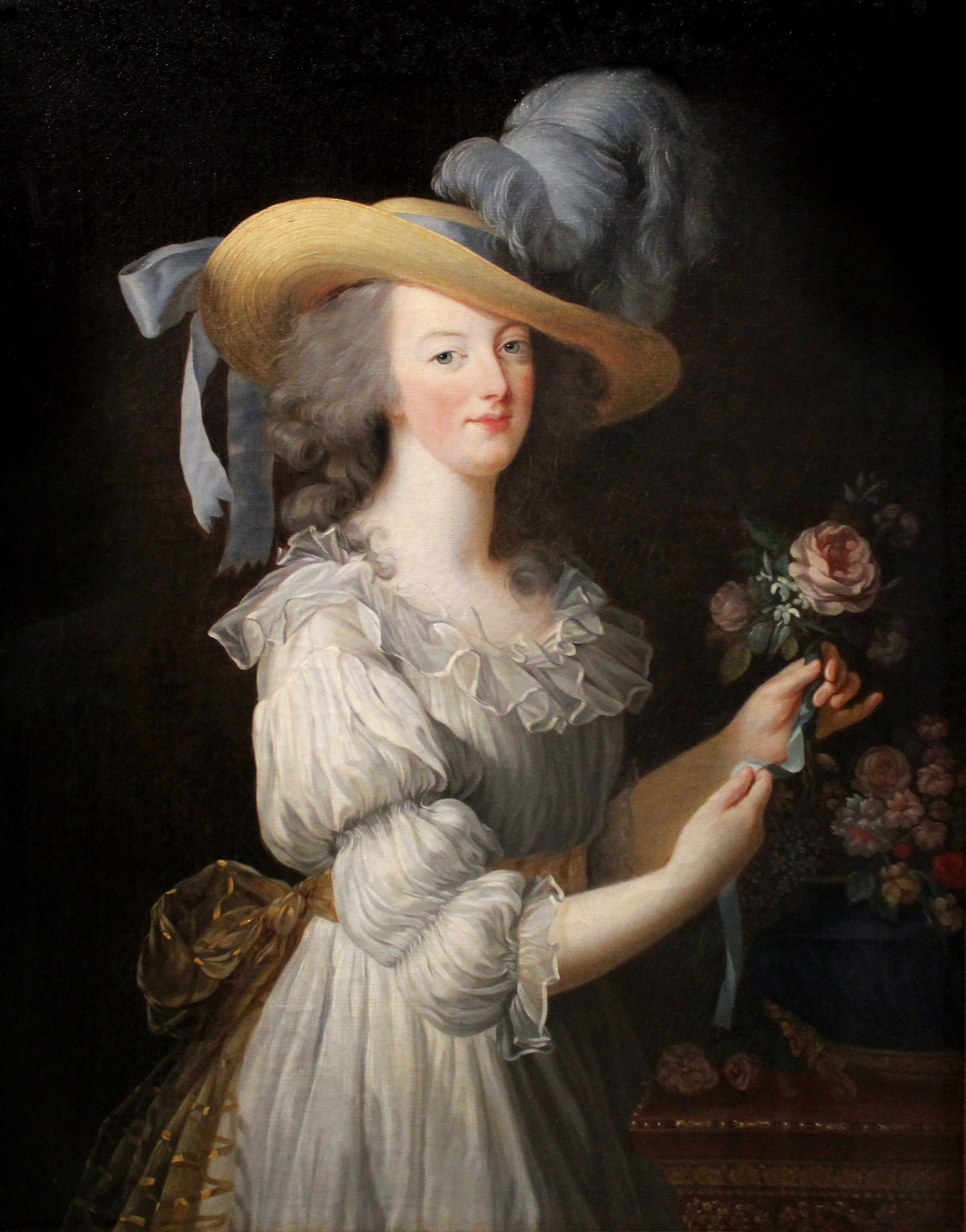
"Marie Antoinette in a muslin dress", Marie Louise Élisabeth Vigée-Lebrun, 1783. She was criticized for not including symbols of royalty in the portrait. When white cotton dresses became en vogue, the queen was criticized for ruining the local silk industry to favor imported cotton.

Courtiers at the Palace of Versailles constantly surrounded Marie Antoinette, leaving her in need of a refuge. She escaped the responsibilities and structure of court life to her private estate.

The image of Marie Antoinette dressing up as a shepherdess or peasant at the hamlet is a deeply entrenched and inaccurate myth. There is no contemporary evidence for Marie Antoinette or her entourage pretending to be peasants, shepherdesses or farmers. Marie Antoinette and her entourage used the hamlet as a place to take private walks and host small gatherings or suppers.

Marie Antoinette also managed the estate by overseeing various works, correcting or approving plans, and talking with the head farmer and laborers. In addition to the head farmer Valy Bussard, Marie Antoinette hired a team of gardeners, a rat-catcher, a mole-catcher, two herds-men, and various servants to work on the estate.

In spite of its idyllic appearance, the hamlet was a real farm, fully managed by a farmer appointed by the queen, with its vineyards, fields, orchards and vegetable gardens producing fruit and vegetables consumed at the royal table. Animals from Switzerland, according to the instructions of the queen, were raised on the farm. For this reason the place was often called "the Swiss hamlet".

She preferred to wear simple clothing uncharacteristic of the frivolous fashion of the French Court while at the hameau, and often dressed in a sun hat and informal muslin dress, a Polonaise gown, or a Chemise à la Reine. The chemise, worn without panniers and with a high waistline, was first worn by women in warmer climates in the colonies and was popularised amongst the aristocracy through Marie Antoinette. The simplicity and high waistline of the garment laid the foundations for Regency/Empire fashion in the later decades during and after the Revolution. The queen often wore a straw Bergère hat and a fichu alongside a Polonaise gown; the term Polonaise referring to the dress of Polish shepherdesses who hoisted and draped their overskirts in two or three loops in order to keep their dress clean while farming. Marie Antoinette's wardrobe was generally imitative of the peasantry of the period.

The place was completely enclosed by fences and walls, and only intimates of the queen were allowed to access it. During the Revolution, "a misogynistic, nationalistic and class-driven polemic swirled around the hameau, which had seemed a harmless agglomeration of playhouses in which to act out a Boucher pastorale." The queen was accused by many of being frivolous, and she found herself a target of innuendos, jealousy and gossip throughout her reign. Although for Marie Antoinette, the hameau was an escape from the regulated life of the Court at Versailles, in the eyes of French people, the queen seemed to be merely amusing herself.

== Cottages ==
Marie Antoinette's Hamlet consisted of a variety of different cottages and buildings, all built around a small lake. Each building had a specific function, and each played its part in the daily life of the Hamlet. The twelve cottages constructed in the hamlet can be divided into two groups: five were reserved for use by the queen; the other seven had a functional purpose and were used effectively for agriculture. Marie Antoinette had her own house, connected to the pool. Nearby was her boudoir. The mill and the dairy received frequent visits from the queen.

=== Queen’s House and Billiard Room ===
The Queen's house and billiard room is situated in the middle of the Hamlet, and it is the largest and most important building. Its construction is innovative: Two rustic buildings are connected by a covered gallery that is curved in a half-moon shape. A spiral staircase offers access to the second floor on one end of the house. These buildings included the queen's private chambers, as well as her salons and her parlors. The upper level comprises the petit salon, also known as the "room of the nobles", an anteroom in the form of a "Chinese cabinet" and the large living room with wood panelling hung with tapestries of Swiss style in embroidered wool. From the room's six windows, the queen could easily control the work fields and activity of the hamlet. Access is via the staircase of the round tower. At the center of the room is a harpsichord which Marie Antoinette loved to play. On the ground floor, paved with single slabs of stone, the building includes a backgammon room and a dining room. The lyre-backed chairs in mahogany lined with green Morocco, were created by Georges Jacob. To the left, another building housing the billiard room is connected to the queen's house by a wooden gallery decorated with trellises and twelve hundred St. Clement faience pots, marked in the blue figures of the queen. Upstairs, a small apartment which seems to have been inhabited by the architect Richard Mique, has five rooms including a library. Despite the rustic appearance of facades, the interior finish and furnishings are luxurious and were created by the carpenter Georges Jacob and the ébéniste Jean-Henri Riesener.

=== Boudoir ===
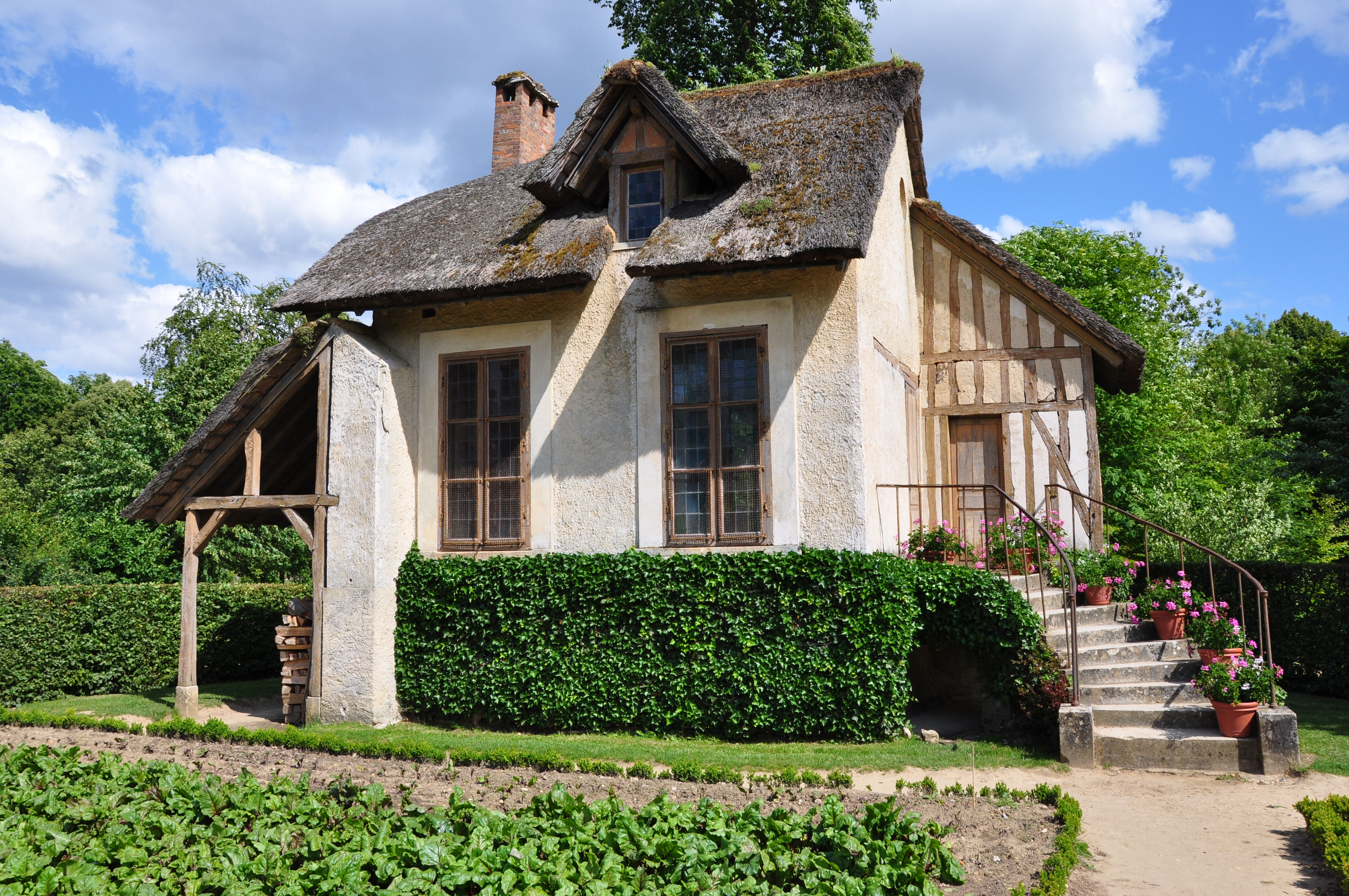
Boudoir

The Boudoir, (4.6 x 5.2 metres) is the smallest structure, and it was nicknamed "the little house of the Queen." Marie Antoinette retired here by herself or else with one or two of her friends. The boudoir was altered slightly during the Second Empire, but its small construction has remained to this day.

=== Mill ===
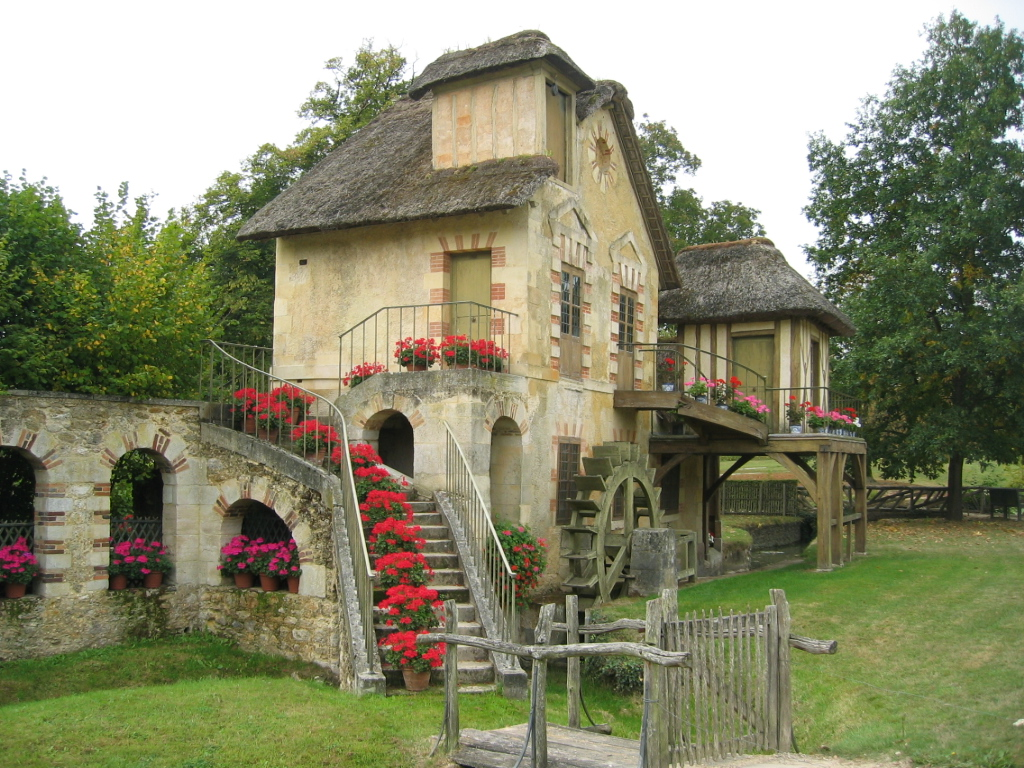
Mill

The Mill, built and fitted from 1783 to 1788, was never used for grinding grain. The wheel is driven by a stream derived from the Grand Lake and is only a decorative element. No mechanism or wheel were installed in the factory. The interior decoration was simple and neat. This structure is one of the most picturesque of the Hamlet. Each façade of the building is decorated slightly differently. This mill also served as a laundry.

=== Marlborough Tower ===
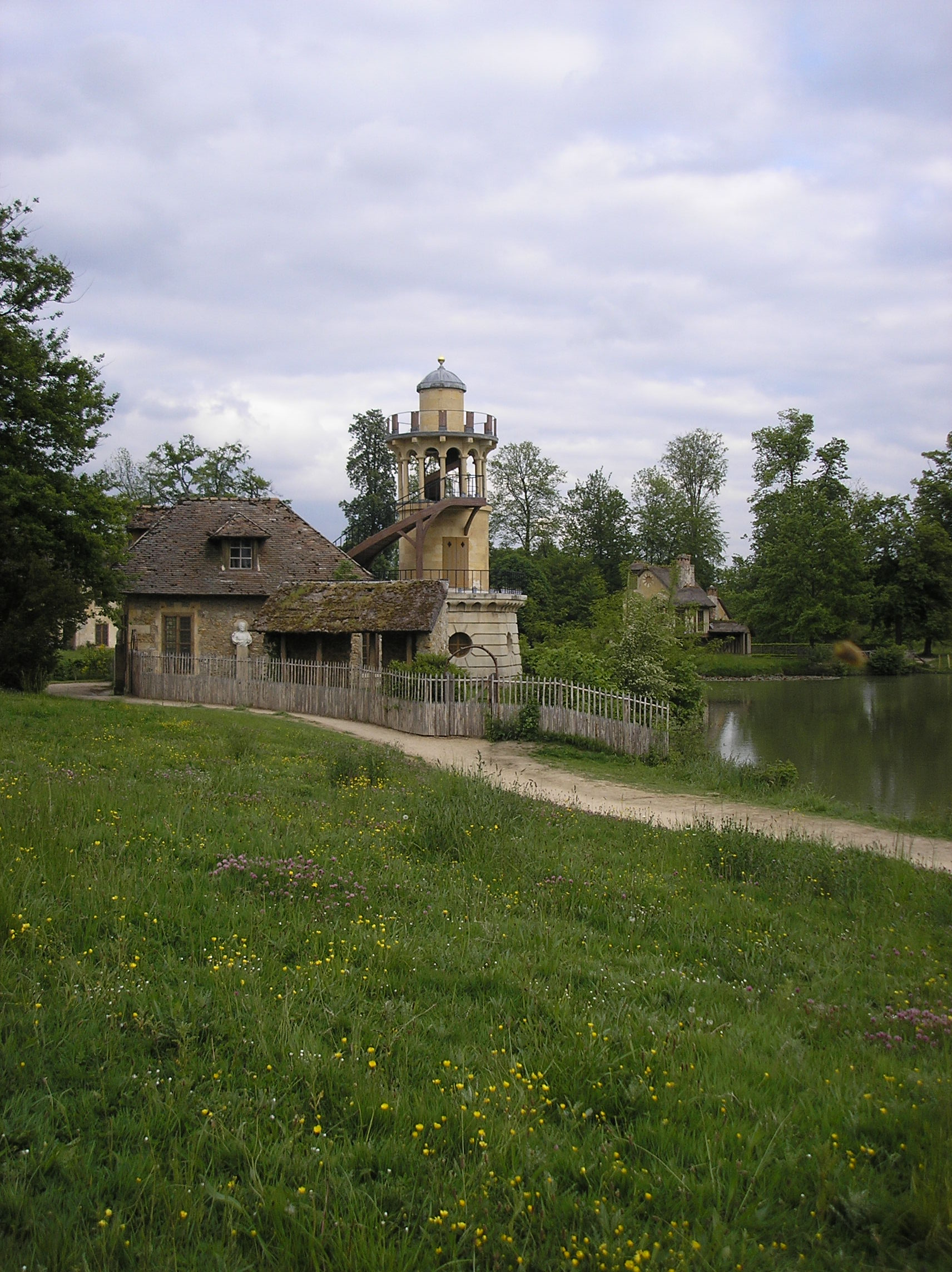
Marlborough Tower

This circular tower on the shores of the lake is mainly decorative. It was originally called "The Fishery Tower." It was created after a popular lullaby from the era. The basement is used for storage, but the top part of the tower has a fairytale-esque design.

=== Réchauffoir ===
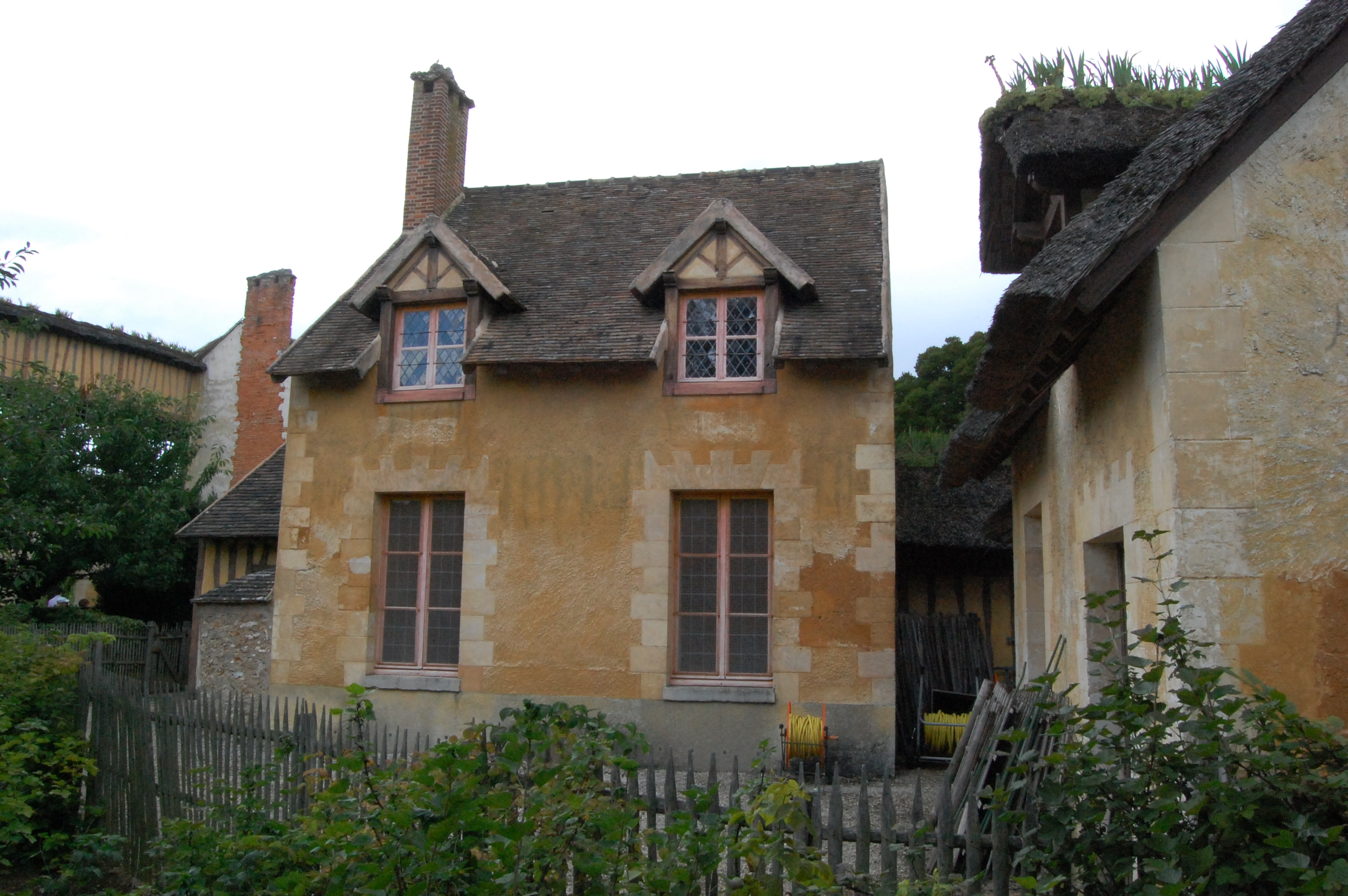
The réchauffoir

The warming room is recessed at the rear of the queen's house. It has a stone interior and included a large kitchen, a bakery, a fireplace and pantry, also linen and silverware. It was used to prepare the dishes for dinners given by the queen in the house or mill.

=== Dairy ===
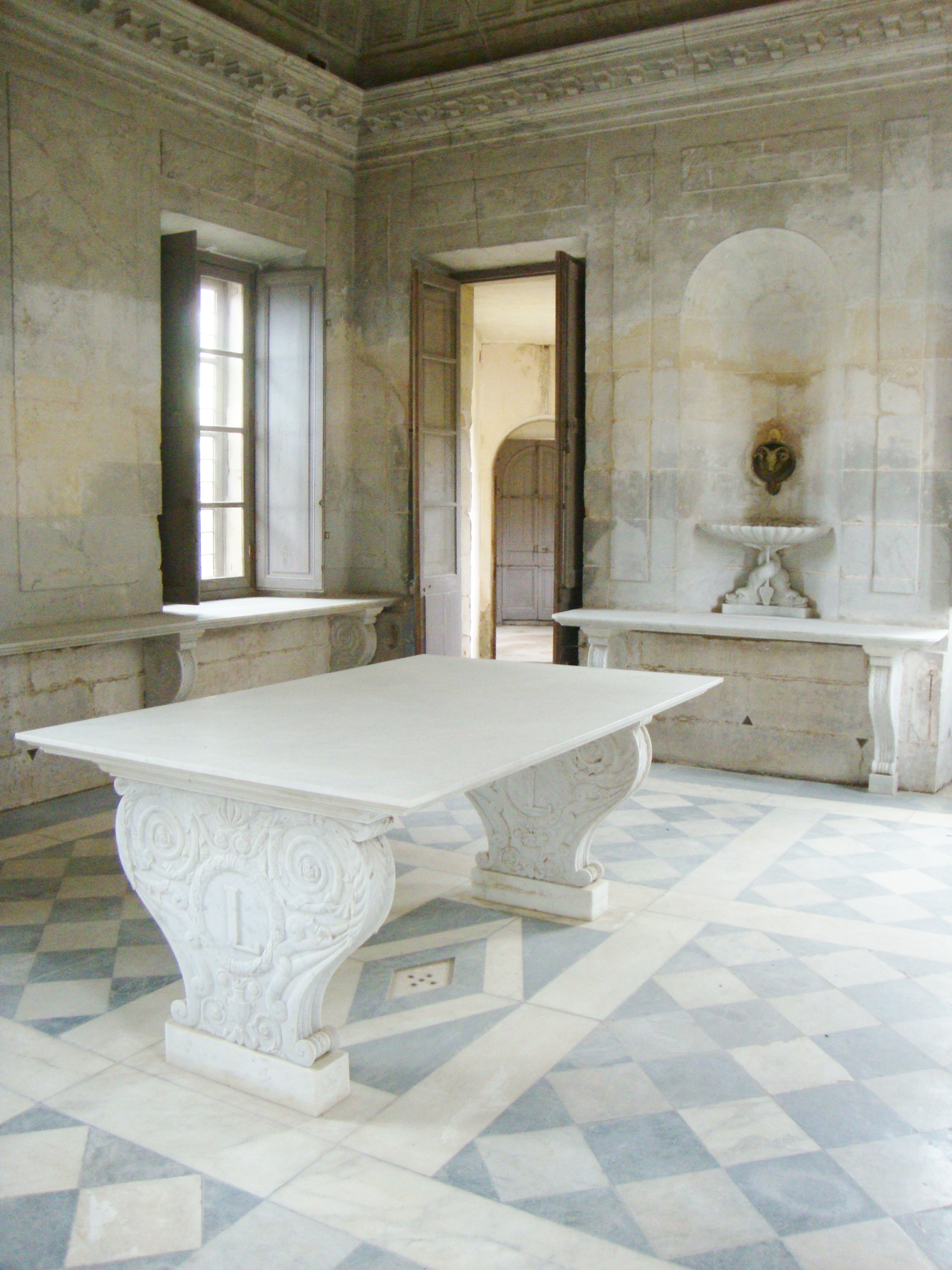
Interior – Laiterie

There were originally two dairies: one in which the dairy products were made and one in which the queen tasted them. The Preparation Dairy was destroyed during the First Empire (First French Empire). Each were designed with sanitation in mind: The rooms are light-colored marble, which gives the impression of cleanliness.

=== Farm ===
Valy Bussard, the farmer, came to the Hameau to run a functional farm. Decorated in a rustic style, the farm included three bedrooms, a kitchen, and a dining room. It was well stocked with animals and had vegetable gardens, whose crops led to agricultural and culinary experimentation at Versailles.

=== Dovecote ===
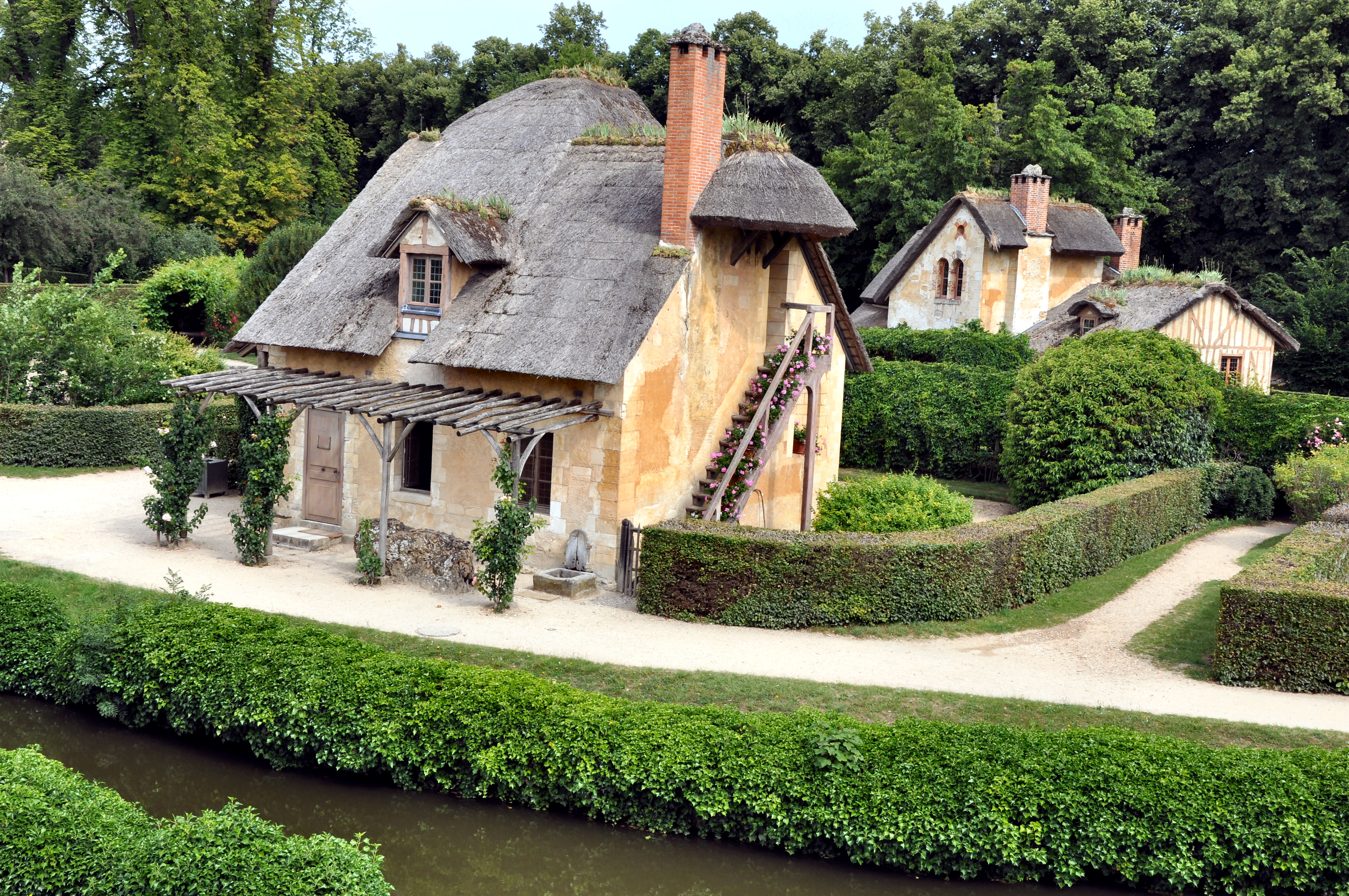
Dovecote and Guard house

The dovecote and pigeon coops were near the lake. Roosters and hens of various species were brought from the west of France and settled in the aviary in 1785 for Marie Antoinette's use.

=== Guardhouse ===
This building is situated on the edge of the field near the woods. Its original occupant was the Swiss guard, Jean Bersy, who lived there with his family. Because of the prominence of the occupants of the Hamlet, the guard was necessary for Marie Antoinette's security.

=== Grange ===
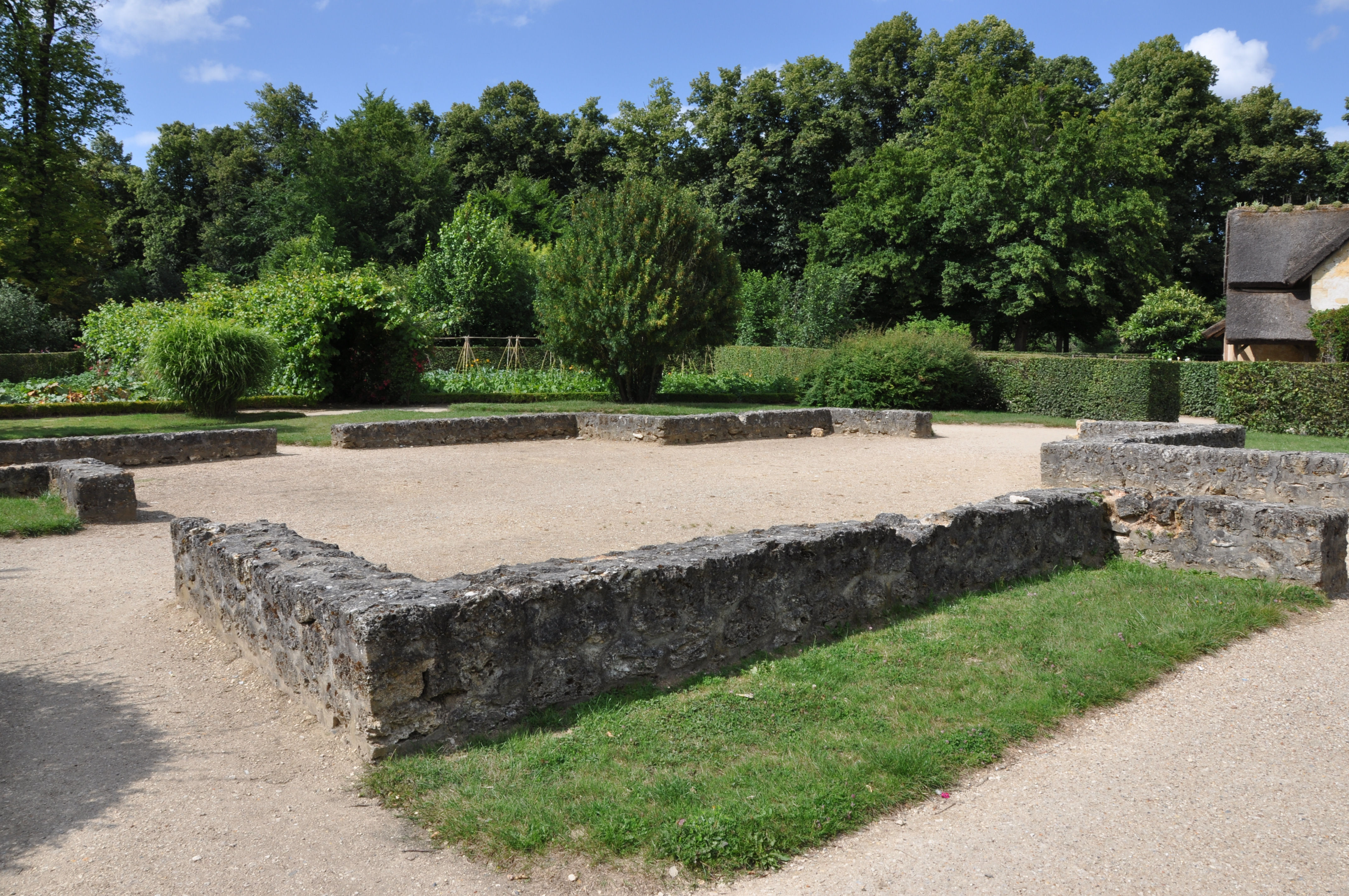
Grange

The barn also served as a ballroom. It was badly damaged during the French Revolution and destroyed during the First Empire.

== See also ==
- Cottage orné
- Ferme ornée
- French landscape garden#The rustic village (hameau) as garden feature
