= Hameau de Chantilly (Paris) =

Cottages in the Élysée Palace gardens

Coordinates: 48°52′09″N 2°18′57″E

The Hameau de Chantilly ('hamlet of Chantilly') in Paris was a group of cottages in the gardens of the Élysée Palace in Paris constructed by Bathilde d'Orléans, Duchess of Bourbon in 1787 in imitation of the Hameau de Chantilly at the Château de Chantilly, her principal residence.

With the Revolution, she left the Élysée in 1792, returning in 1794; she finally left in 1797. The Élysée gardens, also known as the Jardin Bourbon, became a public garden in 1797 where many public celebrations were held.

In 1801, Velloni fils opened the Hameau as a short-lived eating, drinking, and dancing establishment. Here is his announcement:

The hamlet of Chantilly, in front of the Élysée-Bourbon, two doors doors down from the Champs-Élysées and in the Faubourg Saint-Honoré. Corner of Marigny Street.

Velloni Junior has the honor of informing the public that he will shortly open his new location at the Hamlet of Chantilly with an extraordinary celebration. Every day, English picnics will be served, including every kind of cold meat and the best wines, as well as sit-down lunches and other lunches served in the cottages of the hamlet.

A large country café will be set up in the middle of a vast room of greenery: there will be coffee, high tea, chocolate, bavaroises, punch, all kinds of cool drinks, sweet wines, fine liqueurs from the islands, glazed pastries Italian-style, a complete selection of molded ice creams, sherbets, and mousses made by Citizen Tortoni, the pupil and successor of Velloni Senior: a new sparkling lemon drink like the best champagne, a Dutch beer-garden in the middle of the Hamlet, where white beer of the best quality will be served, with various pastries, and generally everything one might desire, all of the best quality, and in the most proper and decent atmosphere. In this huge space there will be all sorts of fun country games, including see-saws, merry-go-round, badminton, water races, dances in the middle of the Hamlet organized by Citizen Julien; a superb promenade on the chateau's terrasse, newly decorated with pavillions with mirrors and statues; a vase with flowers and lights, and many beautiful orange-trees; finally, nothing has been forgotten to make this the most pleasant and elegant visit.

The ticket price will be one franc for the day, of which 75 centimes (15 sous) can go toward any of our offerings, except for dance and country games.

It is proposed to offer once every ten-day week ['decade'] extraordinary celebrations, including a vocal and instrumental concert by Citizen Feydeau's orchestra conducted by Citizen Lahoussaye; beautiful fireworks by Citizen Ruggieri, and magnificent lighting by Citizen Duvergier. The program of these celebrations will be announced in posters, the day before and the day of their presentation. The ticket on those days will cost 2 francs, not including other offerings.

The Jardin Bourbon functioned as a public garden until it was sold to Joachim Murat in 1803 or 1805.

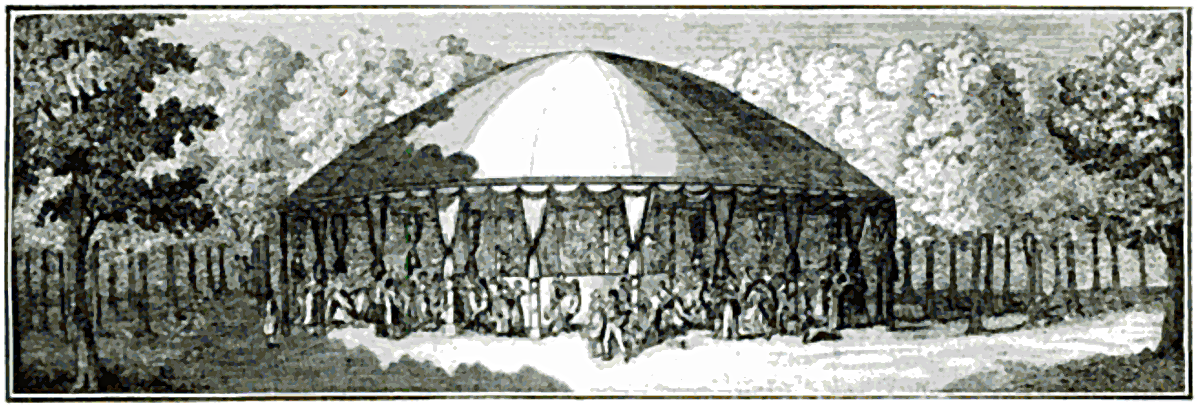
Le Hameau de Chantilly, Pavillon de la danse

== See also ==
- Cottage orné
- Ferme ornée
- French landscape garden#The rustic village (hameau) as garden feature

== Bibliography ==
- Henry Haynie, Paris: Past & Present 2, New York, 1902. at Google Books
