= Madine =

Madine is a surname. Notable people with the surname include:

- Gary Madine (born 1990), English footballer
- Marion Madine (born 1970), Irish swimmer
- Thelma Madine (born 1953), British wedding dressmaker

== See also ==
- Maine (surname)
- Marine (given name)
- Nadine (given name)
