= Chantilly Racecourse =

Thoroughbred racing complex in France

Coordinates: 49°11′30″N 2°28′30″E

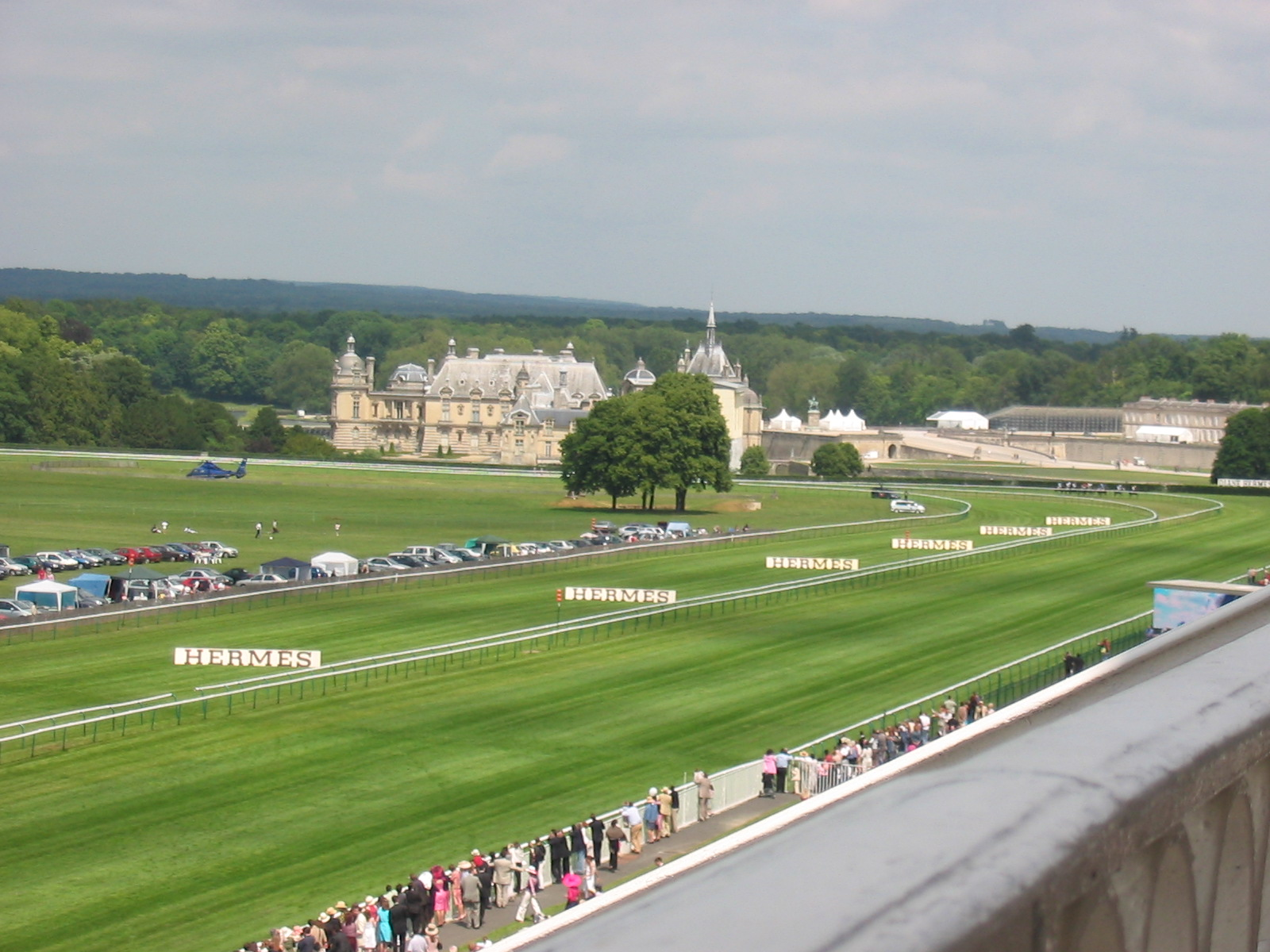
- Prix de Diane 2004, with the Château de Chantilly in the background
- Location: Chantilly, Oise, France
- Owned by: Institut de France; Managed by France Galop
- Date opened: 15 May 1834
- Race type: Thoroughbred - Flat racing
- Notable races: Prix du Jockey Club (1836–); Prix de Diane (1843–); Prix Jean Prat (1858–)

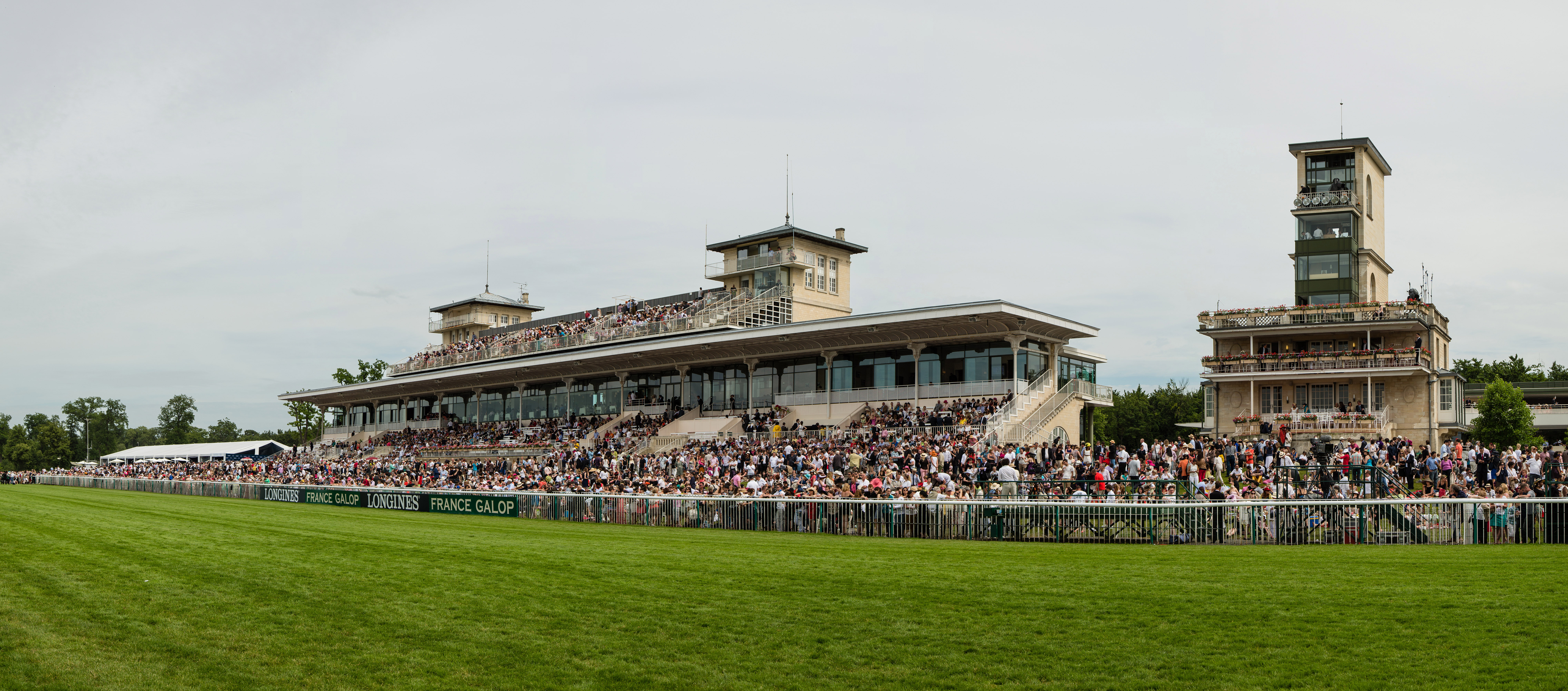
The grandstand during the Prix de Diane in 2013

Chantilly Racecourse (In French: "Hippodrome de Chantilly") is a Thoroughbred turf racecourse for flat racing in Chantilly, Oise, France, about 50 kilometres (31 mi) north of the centre of the city of Paris.

Chantilly Racecourse is located in the country's main horse training area on 65 hectares next to the Chantilly Forest. A right-handed course, it was built with interlocking tracks. The main course is 2,400 metres long, with another at 2,150 metres, plus a round course adaptable from 1,400 to 2,400 metres.

The first race card at Chantilly was held on 15 May 1834 and its existing grandstand was built in 1879 by the famed architect Honoré Daumet, who also did the renovations to the nearby Château de Chantilly. The racecourse was constructed abutting the existing Great Stables (French:Grandes Écuries), built in 1719 by estate owner, Louis Henri, Duc de Bourbon, Prince of Condé. Designed by the architect Jean Aubert, the stable is a remarkable 186 metres in length.

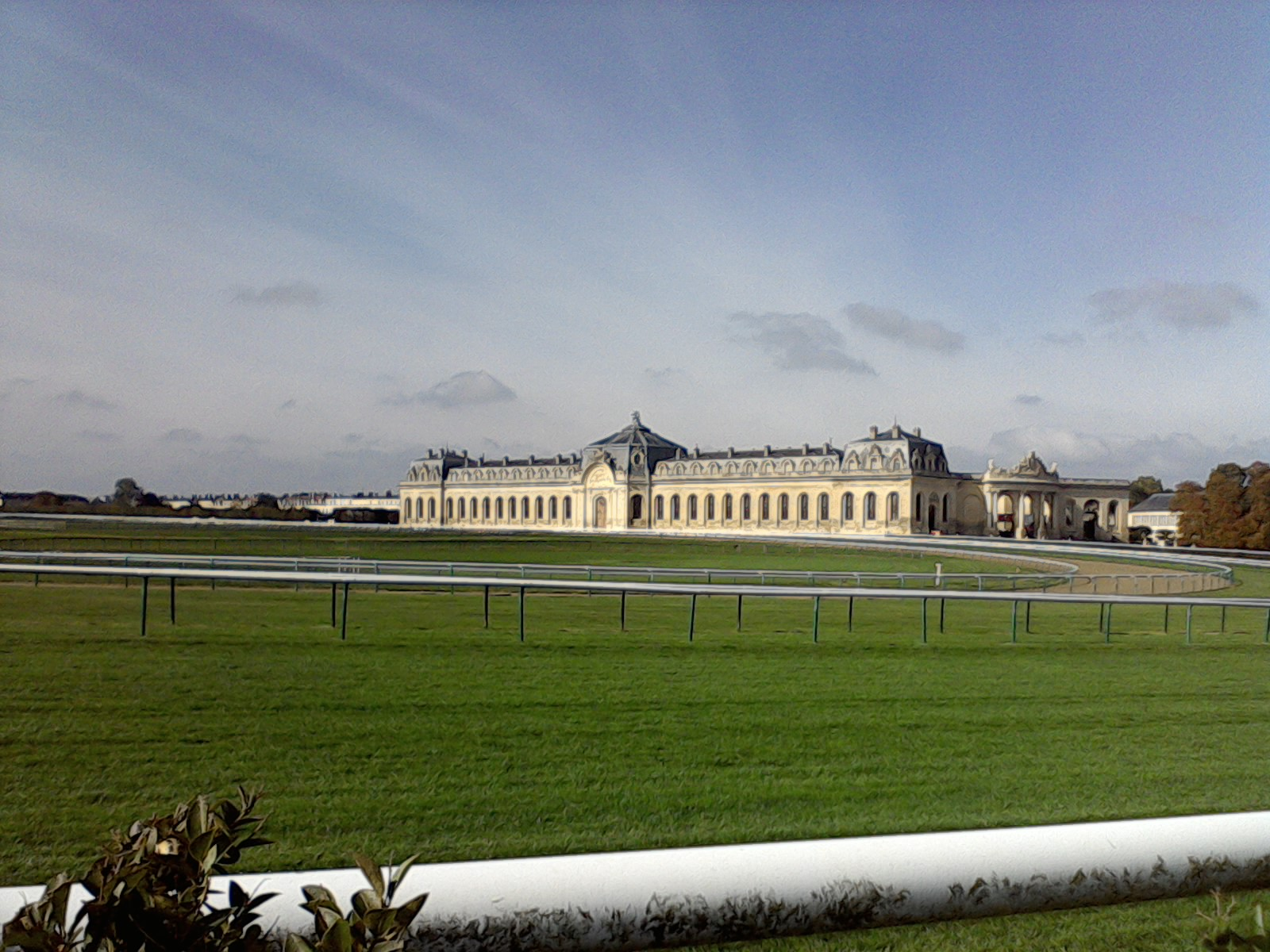
Grandes Écuries at Chantilly Racecourse

In 1886, the Duc d'Aumale donated the racecourse to the Institut de France. In 1982, the Living Museum of the Horse was created as part of the stables which was opened to the public. In July 2006, the museum was acquired by the Foundation for the Safe-keeping and Development of the Chantilly Domain, presided over by the Aga Khan IV.

During the first week of June, the racecourse hosts the Prix du Jockey Club, the third of the French racing season's five Classic Races.

It was used as the venue for the racecourse scene in the 1985 James Bond film A View to a Kill, in which racehorses owned by villainous industrialist Max Zorin (Christopher Walken) competed.

In 2016 and 2017 in addition to Prix du Jockey Club, Chantilly hosted the prestigious Prix de l'Arc de Triomphe, which is normally run at Longchamp. The move from Longchamp was necessitated by ongoing renovation work; the race returned to its historical home in 2018.
