= Jean-François Leroy =

Jean-François Leroy (French pronunciation: [ʒɑ̃ fʁɑ̃swa ləʁwa]; 24 September 1729 - 1791) was a French architect. For the Prince of Condé, he worked on the Château of Chantilly, the Palais Bourbon, and the Hôtel de Lassay, where he replaced Claude Billard de Bélisard in 1780.

== Biography ==
Leroy was born in Chantilly, the son of Jean-Jacques Leroy, building inspector of the Prince of Condé, and Mary-Anne Dunu, daughter of the superintendent of the Château de Chantilly. He entered the service of the prince, following his father. In 1761, he married Toudouze Françoise-Thérèse, daughter of the prince's master of the hunt. He was appointed architect of the Château de Chantilly in 1768, upon the death of his predecessor, Brice Le Chauve.

In Chantilly, he built the Château d'Enghien (1769–1770) and the Hameau de Chantilly (1774–1775).

He worked with Claude Billard de Bélisard on the Palais Bourbon and the Hôtel de Lassay, and then succeeded him in about 1780. In 1782 he revised Bélisard's plan for the Place du Palais Bourbon.

With the landscaper Lecourt, he created the picturesque gardens of Betz-en-Multien for the Princess of Monaco, mistress of the Prince of Condé; all that remains is a prostyle Ionic temple of Love.
