= Marine (given name) =

- Pronunciation: /məˈriːn/
- Gender: Female

Origin
- Origin: several
- Region of origin: several

Other names
- Related names: Marina

Marine can be used as a given name, usually female. Notable people with the name include:

- Marine Atlan, French cinematographer and director
- Marine Bolliet (born 1988), French biathlete
- Marine Boyer (born 2000), French artistic gymnast
- Marine Brenier (born 1986), French politician
- Marine Brevet (born 1994), French gymnast
- Marine Cano (born 1954), American soccer player-coach
- Marine Charrette-Labadie, French social and political activist
- Marine Dafeur (born 1994), Algerian association football player
- Marine De Nadaï (born 1988), French rugby union player
- Marine Debauve (born 1988), French gymnast
- Marine Deleeuw (born 1994), French model
- Marine Delterme (born 1970), French actress
- Marine Fauthoux (born 2001), French basketball player
- Marine Friesen (born 1988), a Brazilian Christian singer and songwriter
- Marine Fukuda (born 2004), a member of Japanese pop group Camellia Factory
- Marine Ghazaryan (born 1985), Armenian sprinter
- Marine Hedge, American murder victim of serial killer Dennis Rader, the BTK Strangler
- Houshou Marine, Japanese virtual YouTuber
- Marine Hugonnier (born 1969), a French and British filmmaker and contemporary artist
- Marine Jahan (born 1959), French actress
- Marine Joatton (born 1972), French sculptor and painter
- Marine Johannès (born 1995), French basketball player
- Marine Jurbert (born 1992), French trampolinist
- Marine Karapetyan (born 1991), Armenian soccer player
- Marine Kuzmanich (1927–2016), American racing driver
- Marine Le Pen (born 1968), French lawyer and politician
- Marine Lorphelin (born 1993), French actress and model
- Marine Miroux (born 1977), French architect
- Marine Oussedik (born 1967), French artist
- Marine Partaud (born 1994), French tennis player
- Marine Petit (born 1992), French artistic gymnast
- Marine Petrossian, Armenian poet, essayist and columnist
- Marine Quiniou (born 1993), French cyclist
- Marine Renoir (born 1987), French actress and model
- Marine Tanguy (born 1989), French art writer
- Marine Vacth (born 1991), French actress and model
- Mariné Russo (born 1980), Olympic hockey player from Argentina
