= Château d'Enghien (Chantilly) =

Coordinates: 49.1927°N 2.4873°E

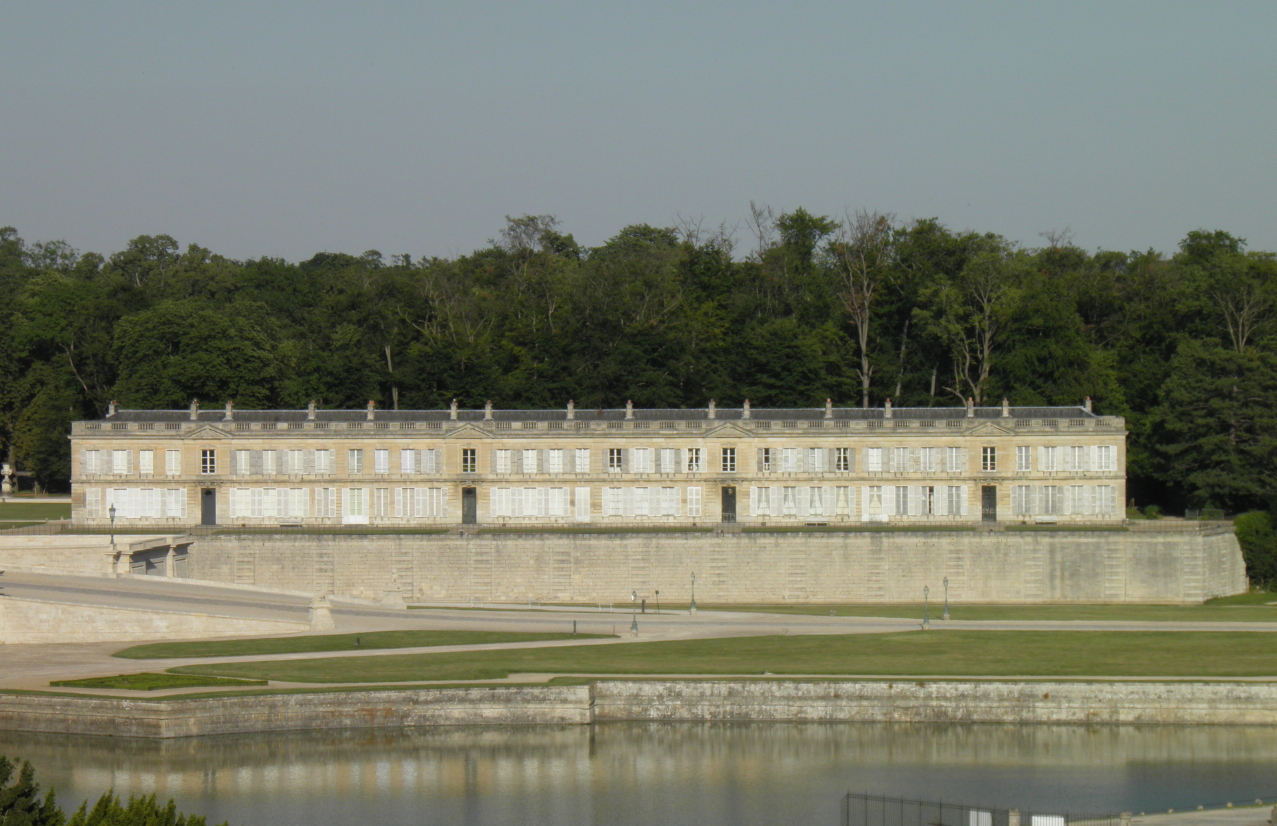
Château d'Enghien

The Château d'Enghien in Chantilly, France is a building within the park of the Château de Chantilly.

It is a long, neoclassical building, designed by Jean-François Leroy in 1769 as lodging for the guests that Louis Joseph, Prince of Condé, entertained at Chantilly.

It was later named in honor of his grandson Louis Antoine, Duke of Enghien, who lived in the building with his nurses after his birth in 1772.

The building is made of four attached pavilions, each with its own entrance and triangular pediment crowned with a balustrade.

The château is now the official residence of the conservator of the Musée Condé and of three academicians.
