= Marine Oussedik =

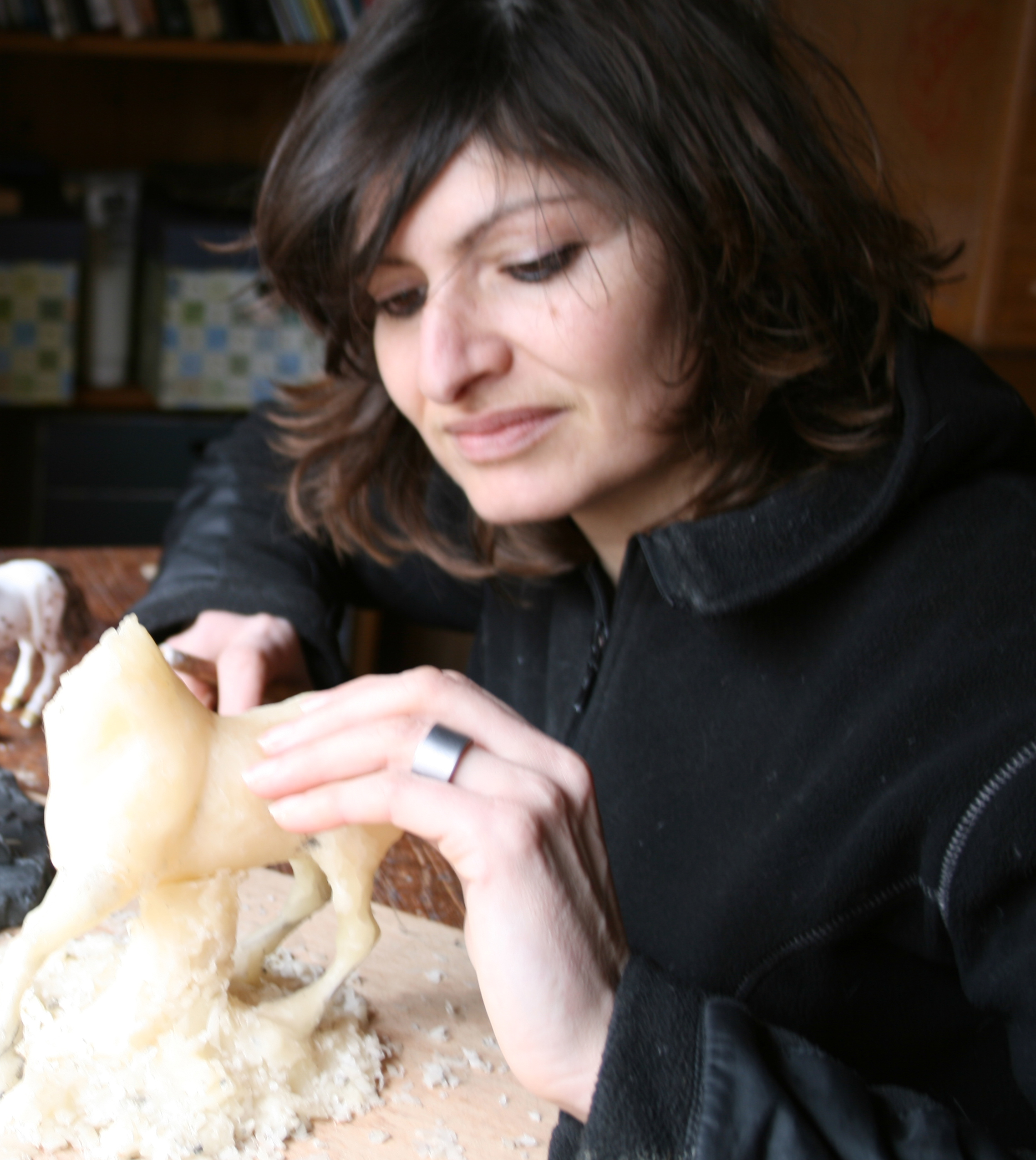
- Marine Oussedik sculpting a wax model in her workshop in Picardy.
- Born: May 20, 1967 (age 58)
- Known for: painting, sculpture, illustration

Marine Oussedik (born May 20, 1967), is a French painter, sculptor and an illustrator specialized in horses. In 1990, she graduated from ESAG Penninghen, and started exhibiting in Parisian galleries the following year. Subsequently, Living Museum of the Horse in Chantilly commissioned several of her paintings to be permanently displayed in two rooms of the museum. She is also an author of several books including, Les chevaux d'encre, Les chevaux du Sahara (1998), Les chevaux du vent (2002), and Les chevaux de rois (2003). in 2004, Pégases awarded her with Prix Pégase for her books: Les chevaux du vent (2002), and Les chevaux de rois (2003). In 2014, she illustrated an art book dedicated to classical French riding written by Guillaume Henry.

As a sculptor she showed her first bronze casts in 1996. Over time, her work expanded into different mediums, creating designs for collections of Gien earthenware called "Horses of the Wind" and "Horses of the Sun" or as a regular contributor for Belin publishing. She mainly works using ink, no models. Her works have been exhibited internationally, such as in Switzerland, England, the United States, the United Arab Emirates and China. In 2010 a major retrospective exhibition of her works was held at Saint Jean castle in Nogent-le-Rotrou, now a museum. Art reviewers have often praised the elegance of her stroke, the delicacy, the accuracy of anatomy, the movement and dream like quality expressed in her works.

== Biography ==
Oussedik has dedicated her life to horses whether through art or in her daily horse-riding.

=== Early life and education ===
Oussedik was born on May 20, 1967, in Neuilly-sur-Seine. Her mother was from Picardy and her father was a Kabyle. She was first introduced to horses when she was five years old, riding ponies in Paris, at the Luxembourg garden. From then on she began drawing horses and would never stop depicting them. When a child she used to run to the balcony of the family flat in Paris whenever she heard the clattering of hooves as the Republican Guard were riding by. However she really started equestrianism when she was ten, following her elder sister who took her to Neuilly's riding-school. Apart from her sister, nobody in her family was especially interested in horses nor rode them.

Oussedik went on studying, "filling her notebooks with horse drawings", to the point of the margin took over the writing space. She spent all her childhood in Paris but regularly escaped to the country, to the family house in Picardy. She contemplated becoming a veterinarian as her grandfather, a vocation which explains her interest in the anatomy and morphology of horses. However she wasn't good enough at mathematics. She instead enrolled at the Pennighen Higher College of Graphic Arts where she was a student for five years, centering her work on the world of horses. She graduated after presenting a humoresque booklet about horse races in the style of Idées Noires, a collection of black comedy comic strips drawn by Franquin.

=== First exhibitions ===
In 1991 Oussedik exhibited her work for the first time in the form of ink drawings in a gallery in the VIth arrondissement of Paris. As a result of this Amaury de Louvencourt, owner of La Cymaise gallery, rue Faubourg Saint-Honoré in Paris, discovered her works and invited her to prepare an exhibition. That was the beginning of a long collaboration. The founder of the Living Museum of the Horse, Yves Bienaimé, discovered her art in Equus magazine. He then asked her for works to be permanently displayed in two rooms of the museum. The first room was dedicated to Arabian horses in Arabian proverbs (in 1993) and the second one (in 1995) to the horse shows as performed within the Museum. According to Yves Bienaimé, the Arabian proverbs room "soon became one of the most beautiful and most popular room in the Museum". This permanent display was visible until 2008 when renovations started in the Museum. It led to the creation of her first art book Les chevaux d'encre (1993) published by the Living Museum of the Horse. It presents a selection of Arabian proverbs dedicated to Arabian horses.

=== Recognition ===
From 1992 on, Oussedik has presented her work several times internationally, such as in Lausanne and Geneva (Switzerland), London (England), Seoul (South Korea), Antwerp and Brussels (Belgium), Shanghai (China) or the United States and the United Arab Emirates. She made her first bronze sculptures in 1996. "Immediately, sculpture was easy for me", she said. Art expert Amaury de Louvencourt encouraged her to persevere. She remains humble as to the success of her works :

"Chivalrous, the young woman doesn't swell with pride, tries oil painting and sculpture while her ink lines keep galloping with spiritual sensitivity (…) we can only rejoice that Marine Oussedik had no gift for maths, " the veterinary association " she wanted to join would have stolen a great artist!" – Côté Sud

In 1998 the book service of Algeria called upon her to illustrate a new edition of Les chevaux du Sahara. She contributed to various books for different publishers and to equestrian magazines such as "Cheval pratique". In 2002 she hosted a presentation of her works about horses, followed by a workshop at the Arab World Institute in Paris; her book Les chevaux du vent, oiseaux sans ailes, was published at the same time.

In 2004 she was awarded the prix Pégase (Pegasus literary prize) by the Academy for the Advancement of Equestrian Culture (ACDE). She became a member of the academy and created the Pegasus prize trophy the following year. She has also created trophies for the Arabian Horse World Championship at the Paris Salon du Cheval (Horse Fair), including the Most Beautiful Head Trophy. In 2010, a retrospective of 20 years of work was held at Saint-Jean museum and castle in Nogent-le-Rotrou during the sixth "Variations Équines" (equine variations) which was dedicated, for the first time, to a sole artist. In 2014 she created new designs for Gien earthenware in the form of the collection "Horses of the Sun", dedicated to Portuguese horses. In October 2014 a fine book of art, the first dedicated to classical French riding, will be published by Belin, Une histoire de l'équitation française (An History of French Riding). Oussedik made about a hundred of drawings to illustrate the texts written by Guillaume Henry. Those original drawings will be exhibited at the Cadre Noir of Saumur (during the AR(T)CHEVAL festival) from October 16 to November 9 and at Equita'Lyon show from October 29 to November 2.

=== Horse-riding ===
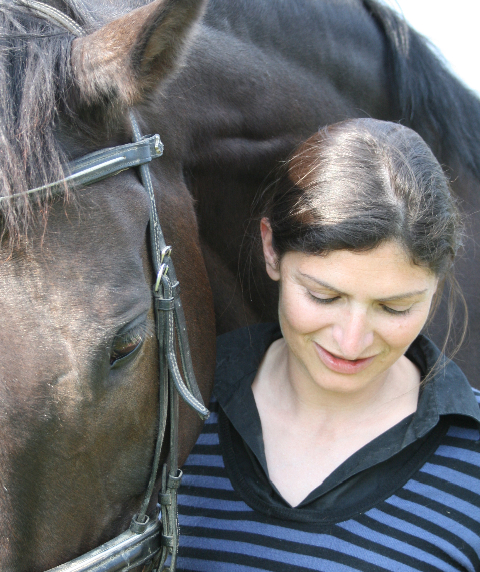
Marine Oussedik with her Selle Français, Jefferson.

Oussedik is also a rider who favors classical dressage. She lives with her two horses on her family estate in Picardy. Her daily life is organized around horse-riding, drawing and sculpting according to the climate and light. She ride two to three hours daily. She prefers developing her relationship with her two horses rather than competing. She thinks that art and horse-riding are similar, both being constantly challenging: "It never ends, there is always room for improvement".

== Works ==
Oussedik may work around a sole theme but the supports she uses are varied. She is interested in many different techniques.

=== Ink, drawings and paintings ===
Oussedik became known for her works made with ink representing harnessed horses on colored and gold papers. Quill and brush enable her to make illustrations as accurate as possible. She also uses charcoal, black chalk, pencil and oil paint. The choice of paper is very important. Oussedik works on colored papers which tints echo the colors of the desert sand. Thanks to these papers she can work with white as a true color. She is on the lookout for rare and quality papers like those made in Egypt by the garbage collectors in Cairo who press the sheets at the drying stage. She also works on paper with gold specks.

=== Sculptures ===
For Oussedik the art of sculpture and that of drawing are complementary both needing to be "as exact as possible whatever the position of the horse". First the model is cast in earth or wax. Because of the fragile balance of the horse (a mass on thin legs) a framework and a support are required. Once the model is finished, it is molded and twelve bronze casts can be made before the molding is destroyed.

=== Tableware and toys ===
The first collection she created for Gien earthenware, "Horses of the Wind", revolves around Arabian horses. It was followed by a limited edition of hand-painted items. She also produced several unique items enhanced with gold for an exhibition in Dubai at Dubai Mall: "Dream Objects, Icons of French Style" in 2010. She produced another collection in 2014 called "Horses of the Sun", dedicated to Portuguese horses. Oussedik has also created several toys. She has signed the "Horse" figurines of the French brand Papo and has designed original items like games of "Petits chevaux", a French alternative of Parcheesi and Ludo, with terracotta figurines, and an Arabian horse on wheels. Original items were on display during the "Variations Équines" exhibition in 2012 centered on "Le cheval amusant" (fun with horses) at the museum-castle in Nogent-le-Rotrou.

=== Performances ===
Oussedik has also taken part in live performances. During the show "Celebrating horses", organized by Jean-Louis Gouraud at Maison des Cultures du Monde on September 23, 1998, she was filmed drawing live on stage in front of an audience. All the profit were donated to the restoration of the necropolis of the tzars's horses. She also performed live at Maison des Cultures during the "Horsewoman" show in June 2003. In 2012, during the "Night of the Horse" show at Paris Salon du Cheval, her illustrations of Portuguese horses were projected and a film was shown where she could be seen drawing horses on glass plates from the view point of the camera.

== Artist's impression ==
Stendhal's citation

" True happiness is having one's passion for a profession ".

Oussedik believes that her pictorial art can't be separated from her equestrian art, that being an artist relies on a daily routine necessary to train one's hand whatever the gifts you are born with. That's why she is drawing daily, otherwise she feels " bored and missing something ". She thinks that work and passion are inseparable as symbolized by Stendhal's quote on her desk. Her artistic style has matured towards volume. In the early part of her career, her works appeared as silhouettes of horses which, as time passes by, become three-dimensional and full-bodied. Oussedik started sculpting in 1996 a logical step in her artistic career. What she learned from sculpting she used while drawing. Her studio in Picardy brings her the peace of mind and the light she needs to create.

Although she owns several horses who might be used as models (she can see her two horses from her working table), she would rather talk of "equestrian impregnation". She draws from memory – as she lives with horses she can observe their attitudes and expressions – and uses her equestrian knowledge. She thinks that horses are not easy animals to depict. The slightest alteration of proportion and all the drawing goes wrong. She thinks that, would she use a photography, her drawing would lack life and movement. That's why she chooses to forget the model to be free and develop her own style. She only uses photographs when she has to depict historical elements, for example. Living with horses is the right approach: thus she can capture the shape of the animal she then reproduces.

Oussedik has illustrated a great variety of subjects from the equestrian world: Arabian horses, Iberian ones, hunting, life in the stables, coaches, polo, side-saddle riding, bull fighting, horse racing. Arabian horses are the primary focus of her work, often described as a central aesthetic element. She portrays these horses alongside traditional accoutrements, including stable rugs, ornate saddlecloths, and harnesses, as well as within desert environments featuring associated animals such as sloughis and falcons. She also likes the power and expressiveness Iberian horses radiate. They started playing a bigger part in her work in 1995 when she met them at the Living Museum of the Horse. She made illustrations of Jerez Royal Riding School, Spanish carriages "a la calasera" and bull fighting for the exhibition "Horses from the South" at La Cymaise gallery late 2002.

== Critical reception ==
Today her works are quite well-known all over the world. Their unique style is her signature. The accuracy of anatomy and their delicacy, especially when made with ink, have been widely noticed by art reviewers: "Thanks to her very accurate lines, the horses that Marine Oussedik shows us are not domesticated but tamed", says one of them. The words delicacy, nobility, femininity are often used to qualify her work. Blaise de Chabalier, art reviewer for the French national daily Le Figaro, mentions the "sophisticated and sensual atmosphere created by the complicity of bodies and looks", the dreamlike quality of her drawings allied to a realistic approach, when liberty of movement meets civilisation as expressed through harnessing. Xavier Viader in the racing daily Paris-Turf defines her work as " elegant, spontaneous and alive " and sees her as a descendant of Géricault and Delacroix, adding that the accuracy of anatomy is no obstacle to the emotional quest of the viewer. Indeed, Marine Oussedik's horses are fiery.

"When we speak of elegance, spontaneity, vivacity, smiles, wink, authenticity about Marine Oussedik we don't know if we mention the artist or her works (...) when you meet Marine, everything seems simple, easy. That tells a lot about how gifted she is!" – Xavier Viader, Paris-Turf. "A delicate but powerful stroke of pen, hints of colors, a dash of white and an eye becomes alive... Marine Oussedik's horses don't need to be signed by the artist, they are her signature!" – Virginie Bauer, Arabians Horse Magazine. After reading Les chevaux du vent, writer Jérôme Garcin dedicated a paragraph to her in his book Journal équestre: "as an illustrator, she demonstrated a dual skill: her ink brush has an almost ethological accuracy but she keeps us dreaming. Arabian horses are the source of her inspiration. With pride and tenderness she makes them dance, play, fight, parade and fly towards Allah's sky. Abdallah Akbar's calligraphy follows this meditation and we don't know when the writing stops and the drawing starts." – Jérôme Garcin, Cavalier seul.

According to the art magazine Equus, other artists have tried to imitate her art but none have managed to succeed.

== Bibliography ==
- Oussedik, Marine (1993). Les chevaux d'encre : Proverbes d'orient illustrés. Musée Vivant du Cheval. Out of print.
- Abd-El-kader and Eugène Daumas (ill. Marine Oussedik), Les chevaux du Sahara, OLA, May 5, 1999, 275 p. (ISBN 2913437001 and 978-2913437005), out of print.
- Marine Oussedik, Les chevaux du vent : Oiseaux sans ailes, Martelle, November 2002, 120 p. (ISBN 287890088X and 978-2878900880) rewarded by Prix Pégase 2004
- (in French and Portuguese) Marine Oussedik (pref. Carlos Henriques Pereira), Les chevaux de rois, Martelle, October 29, 2003, 119 p. (ISBN 2878900936 and 978-2878900934) Rewarded by Prix Pégase 2004.
- L'imagier des chevaux d'Europe, Castor et Pollux, coll. " L'imagier de Castor & Pollux ", 2005, 53 p. (ISBN 2912756960 and 9782912756961). Illustrations of 150 European breeds of ponys and horses

classified according to countries.

== Sources ==
=== Press articles ===
- Viader, Xavier (November 29, 1998). "Un livre, le Salon du Cheval, La Cymaise et... les chevaux en tête de Marine Oussedik". Paris-Turf (in French).
- Viader, Xavier (December 8, 2000). "Marine Oussedik et ses chevaux du Sud". Paris-Turf (in French).
- de Chabalier, Blaise (December 23–24, 2000). "Chevaux d'encre et de bronze". Le Figaro (in French).
- Attali, Sophie (August–October 2002). "Marine Oussedik". Equus – Les chevaux (in French). No. 50. pp. 34–38.
- Normand, Frédéric (November 10, 2002). "Marine Oussedik mêle art et équidés". Le Parisien (in French).
- Boidanghein, Isabelle (November–December 2005). "Les chevaux d'encre de Marine Oussedik". Pays du Nord (in French). No. 68. p. 45.
- Bauer, Virginie (April–June 2011). "Marine Oussedik : entre équilibre et justesse". Arabians horsemag (in French). pp. 134–143.
- Tsaag Valren, Amélie (July–August 2013). "Rencontre avec Marine Oussedik". Cheval Savoir (in French). No. 45.

=== TV ===
- (in French) «Marine Oussedik», by Michelle Hauteville and Laurent Desprez, coll. «Le magazine du cheval», Saturday January 23, 1999: Diffusion France 3 national January 28, 1999 at 14h05.
- (in French) «La cavalière peintre», by Halima Najibi in Picards d'ici, 18 décember 2005: Diffusion France 3 Picardie at 18h50
- (in French) «Championnat du monde du cheval arabe – 7 décembre 2011», by Luca Bergamaschi, Enora contant, Equidia Life, coll. «La Culturelle», December 7, 2011, diffusion Equidia Life
- (in French) "Marine Oussedik", by Luca Bergamaschi, Enora contant, Equidia Life, coll. "La Culturelle", November 21, 2012, diffusion Equidia Life

=== Books ===
- Garcin, Jérôme (2007). Cavalier seul : journal équestre (in French). Paris: Gallimard. ISBN 978-2-07-034298-3. OCLC 470572480.
- Renauldon, Pascal (2010). Yves Bienaimé, l'écuyer-jardinier (in French). Monaco: Éditions du Rocher. ISBN 978-2-268-06897-8. OCLC 549150114.
