= Living Museum of the Horse =

Museum in France

Coordinates: 49.1936994°N 2.4797697°W

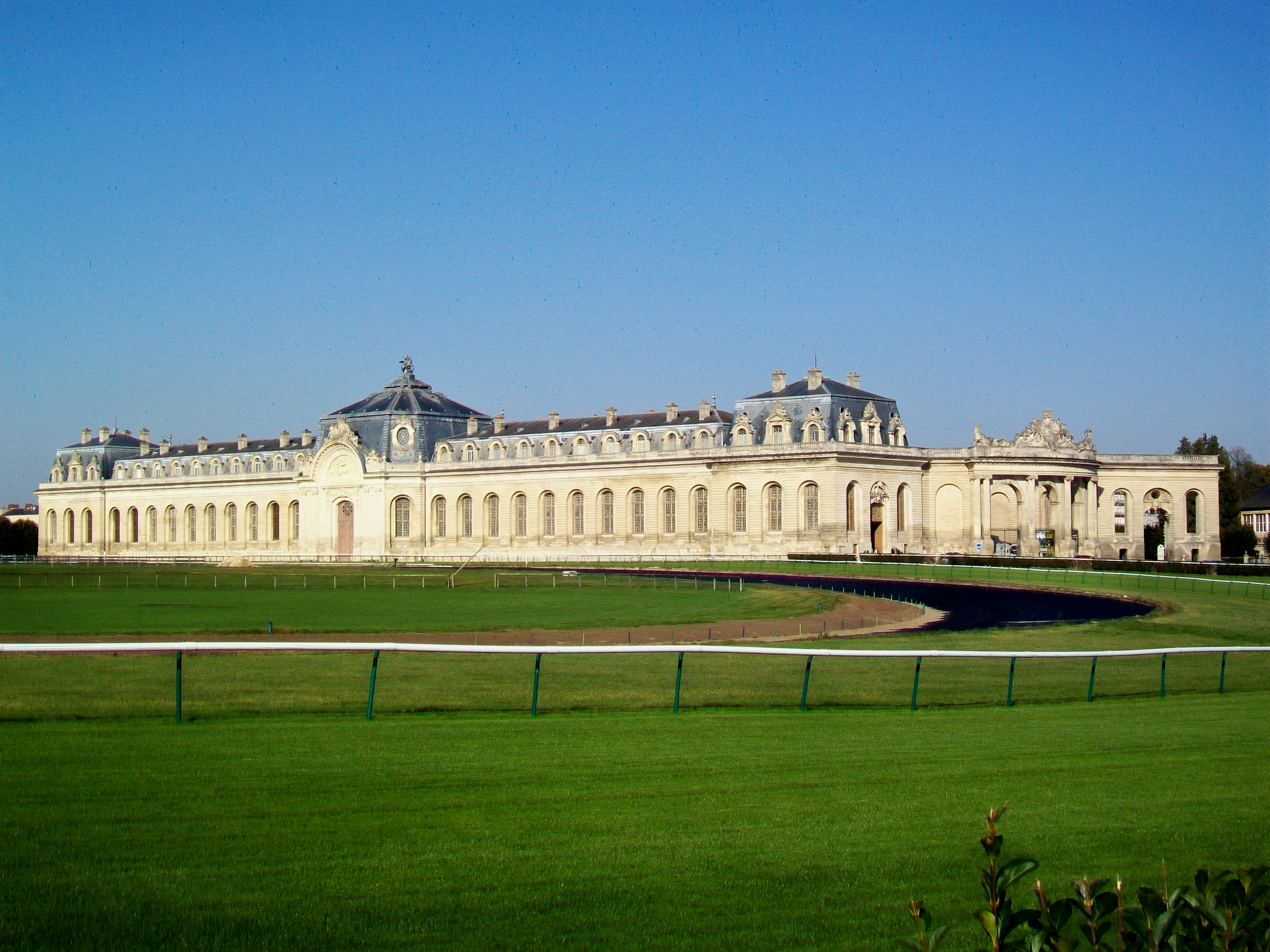
The Great Stables, home of the museum

The Living Museum of the Horse (French: Musée Vivant du Cheval) is a museum in Chantilly, France dedicated to equine art and culture. It is housed in the Great Stables (Grandes Écuries) of the Château de Chantilly, about 40 km (25 mi) north of Paris.

== History ==
The Great Stables were built in 1719, on the orders of Louis Henri, duke of Bourbon, Prince of Condé, who believed that he would be reincarnated as a horse. He asked the architect, Jean Aubert, to build stables that would be suitable to house a horse of his rank. The resulting 186 m long stables are considered a masterpiece of 18th century architecture. The stables could house 240 horses and up to five hundred hounds.

In 1830, Henri d'Orléans, duke of Aumale, the fourth son of King Louis-Philippe, inherited the château from his uncle, the Duc de Bourbon. In 1886, Henri bequeathed the château, the stables, the racecourse, and almost 8 km^{2} of forest land to the Institut de France, with the stipulation that it should be preserved as it was.

Riding master Yves Bienaimé had begun his career in 1959, in the riding school housed in the stables. Twenty years later, he was struck by the state of neglect of the still-impressive building. He decided he would do what he could to bring back some of the former glory of the stables. On 6 June 1982, after four years of negotiations with the Institut over the concession, Yves and Annabel Bienaimé opened the museum to the public. Yves Bienaimé discovered Marine Oussedik's art in Equus magazine. He then asked her for works to be permanently displayed in two rooms of the museum. The first room was dedicated to Arabian horses in Arabian proverbs (in 1993) and the second one (in 1995) to the horse shows as performed within the Museum.

== Museum ==
The museum has 31 rooms with exhibits comprising over 1,200 paintings, drawings, sculptures, and ceramics, covering equine topics like horsemanship, horse-drawn transport, art, history, equine health, and riding equipment. The museum is referred to as "living" because it houses 31 horses of various breeds. Part of the intent of the museum is to promote the education of the public by encouraging interaction with the animals. Three to five dressage demonstrations each day illustrate the basis of horsemanship, and a large equestrian show is presented at least once a month. The privately run museum receives approximately 200,000 visitors each year; it receives no public subsidy or funding from the Institut de France. The current director of the museum is Sophie Bienaimé, daughter of the founder.

== Popular culture ==
The château and museum appeared in the 1985 James Bond film A View to a Kill, where it portrayed the French home and stables of villain Max Zorin, played by Christopher Walken.
