= Château de Chantilly =

Castle in Chantilly, France

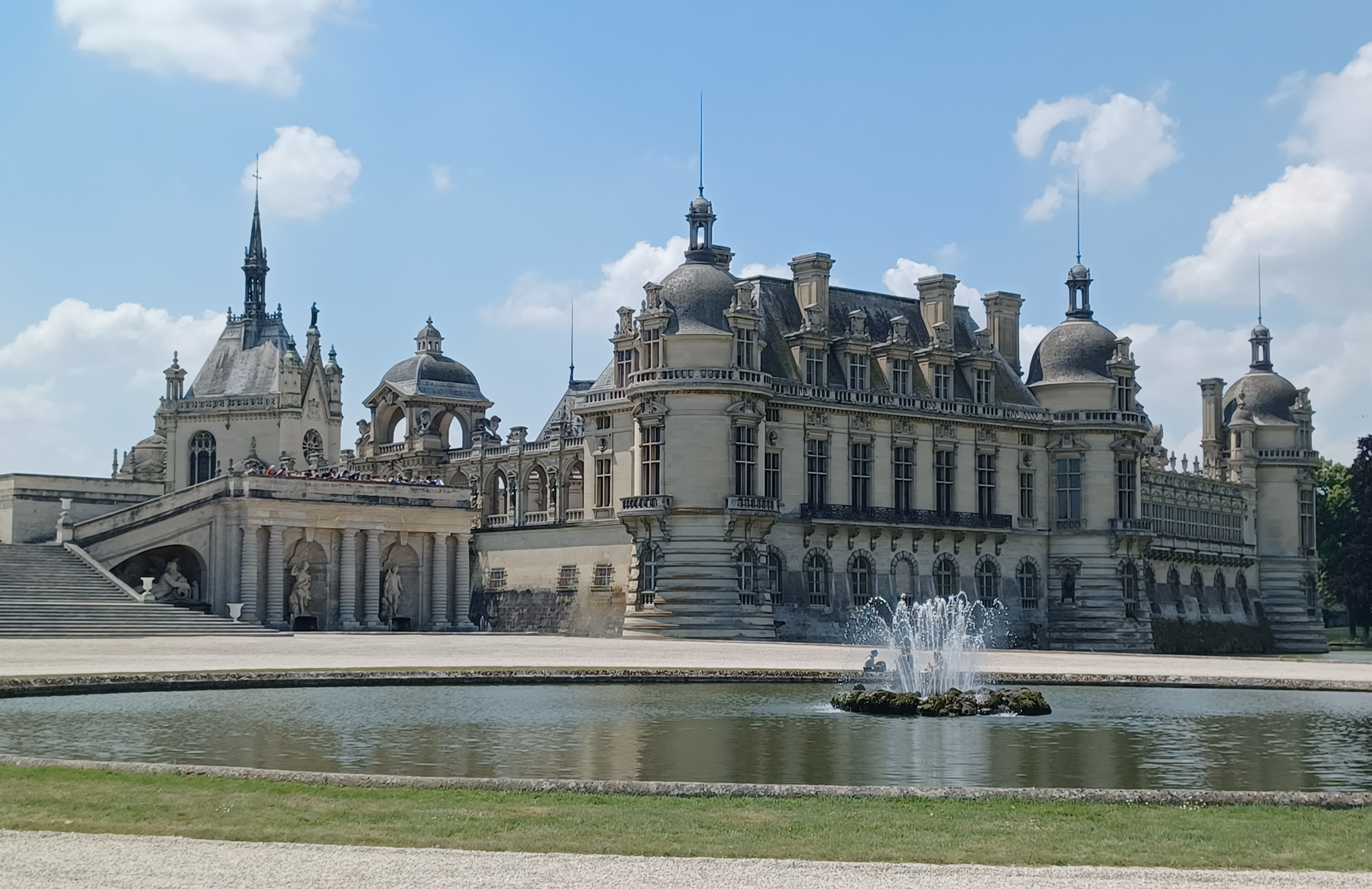
The Château de Chantilly

The Château de Chantilly (pronounced [ʃɑto d(ə) ʃɑ̃tiji]) is a historic French château located in the town of Chantilly, Oise, about 50 kilometres (30 miles) north-northeast of Paris. The site comprises two attached buildings: the Petit Château, built around 1560 for Anne de Montmorency, and the Grand Château, which was destroyed during the French Revolution and rebuilt in the 1870s. The château is owned by the Institut de France, which received it from Henri d'Orléans, Duke of Aumale.

A historic monument since 1988, it is open to the public. The château's art gallery, the Musée Condé, houses one of France's finest collections of paintings. It specialises in French paintings and book illuminations of the 15th and 16th centuries.

== History ==
=== Original construction ===
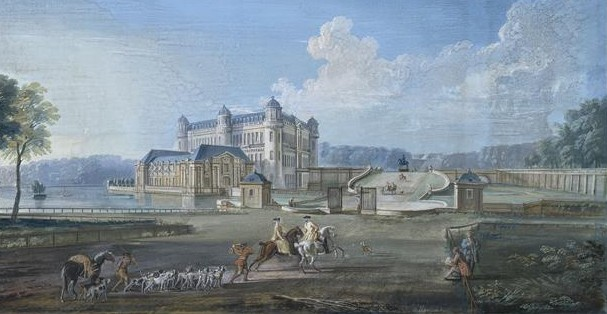
The Château de Chantilly at the time of the Grand Condé

The estate's connection with the Montmorency family began in 1484. The first mansion (no longer in existence, now replaced by the Grand Château) was built, between 1528 and 1531, for Anne de Montmorency by Pierre Chambiges. The Petit Château was also built for him, around 1560, probably by Jean Bullant. In 1632, after the death of Henri II de Montmorency, it passed to his nephew, the Grand Condé, who inherited it through his mother, Charlotte Marguerite de Montmorency.

Molière's play Les Précieuses ridicules received its first performance here in 1659. Madame de Sévigné relates in her memoirs that when King Louis XIV visited there in 1671, François Vatel, the maître d'hôtel to the Grand Condé, committed suicide when he feared the fish would be served late. The collection includes important works of the cabinetmaker André-Charles Boulle.

=== Revolution and aftermath ===
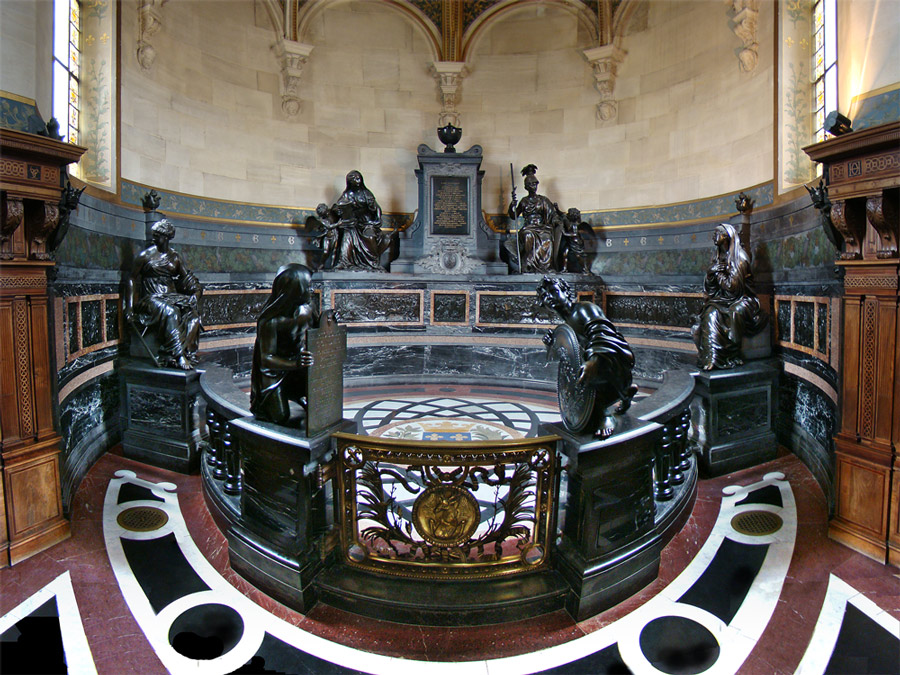
The chapel of the Hearts of the Princes of Condé

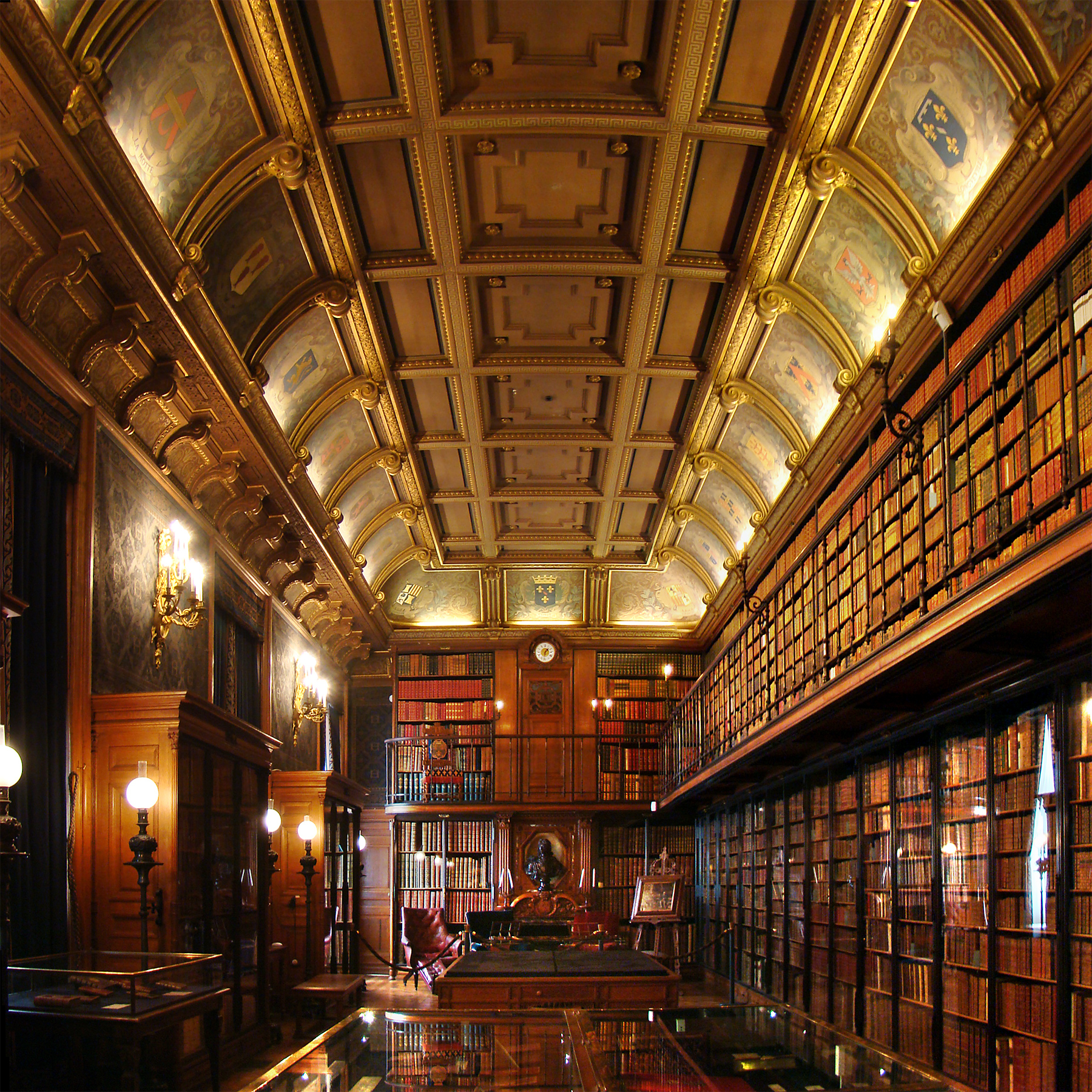
The Château's library

The original mansion was destroyed during the French Revolution. It was repaired modestly by Louis Henri II, Prince of Condé, but the entire property was confiscated from the Orléans family between 1853 and 1872, during which interval it was owned by Coutts, an English bank. Chantilly was entirely rebuilt, between 1875 and 1882, by Henri d'Orléans, duc d'Aumale (1822–1897). The new château met with mixed reviews. Boni de Castellane summed up one line of thought: "What is today styled a marvel is one of the saddest specimens of the architecture of our era — one enters on the second floor and descends to the salons". In 1889, the Chateau was bequeathed to the Institut de France as a price for the Duc d'Aumale's return from political exile.

=== 21st century restoration ===
The World Monuments Fund included the site in the 1998 World Monuments Watch to call attention to water infiltration and high humidity in the Galerie des Actions de Monsieur le Prince and again in the 2002 World Monuments Watch due to the precarious condition of the entire estate. Funding for restoration work was provided from various sources, including American Express and the Generali Group.

Subsequently, in response to an appeal for the restoration of the château, The Aga Khan donated €40 million, accounting for more than half of the €70 million needed by the Institut de France to complete the project. In 2008, the World Monuments Fund completed the restoration of the Grande Singerie, a salon with paintings on the walls of monkeys engaged in human activities, once a fashionable salon motif, but with few examples surviving today.

== Musée Condé ==
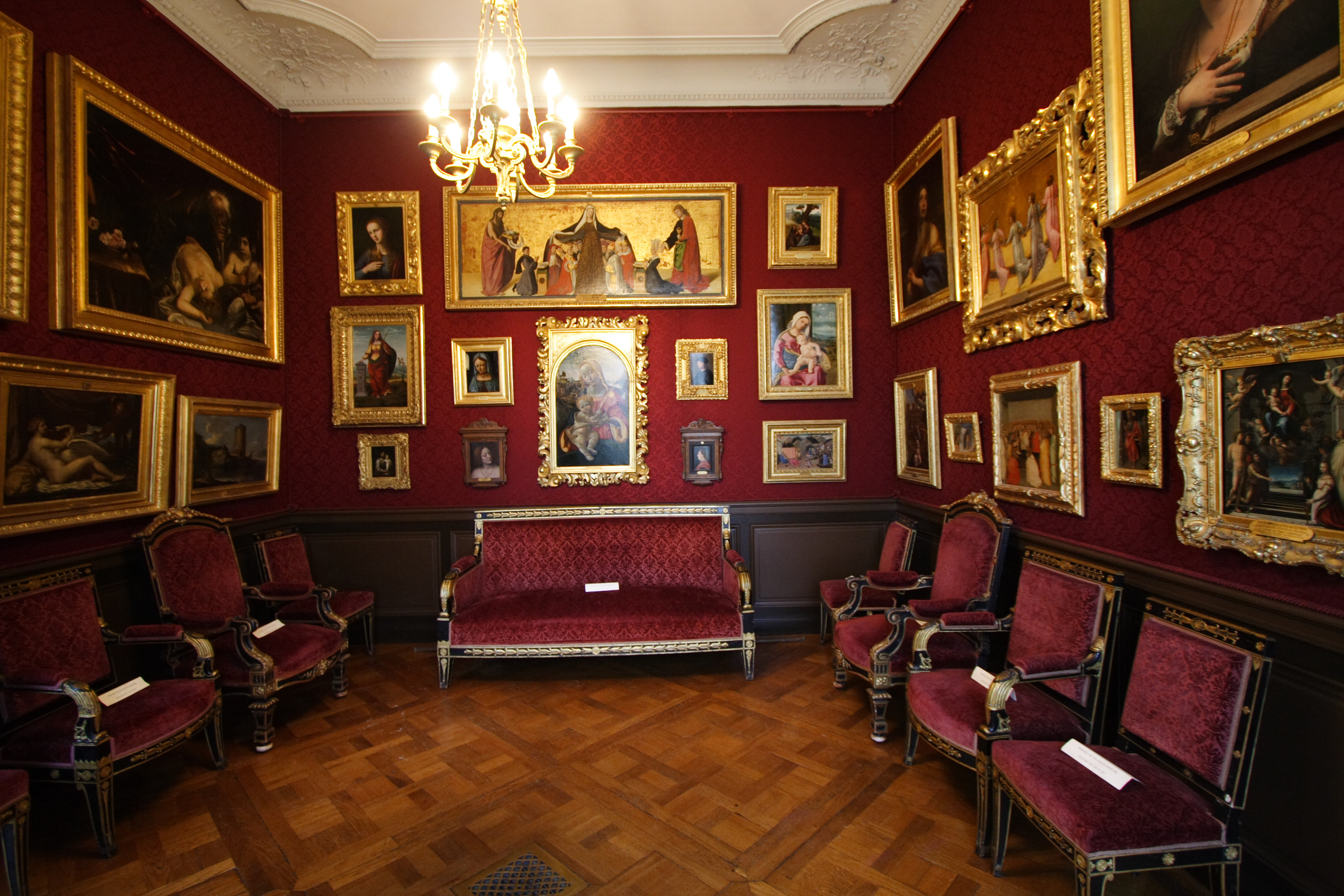
The art gallery of Chantilly is one of the largest in France

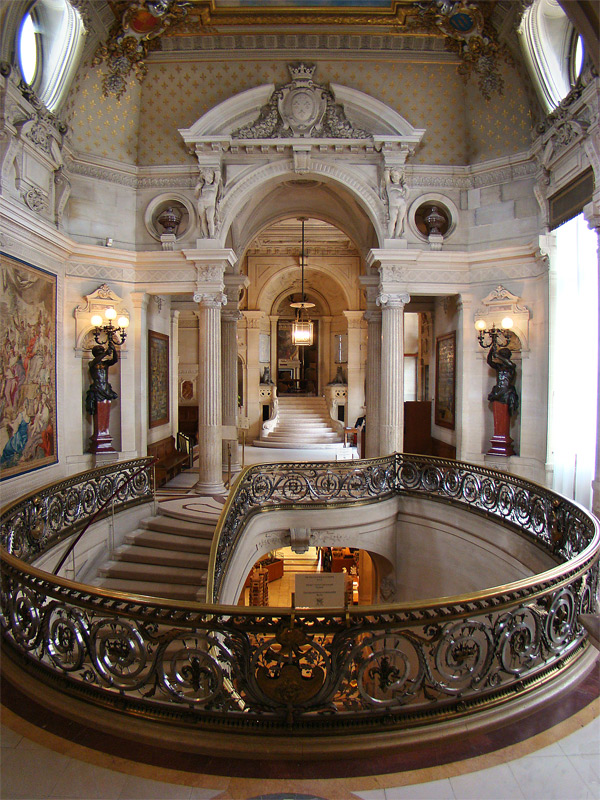
The hall of honour

Works in the art gallery (many of them are in the Tribune Room) include Sassetta's Mystic Marriage of St. Francis, Botticelli's Autumn, Piero di Cosimo's Portrait of Simonetta Vespucci, Raphael's Three Graces and Madonna of Loreto, Guercino's Pietà, Pierre Mignard's Portrait of Molière as well as four of Antoine Watteau's paintings and Jean-Baptiste-Camille Corot's Le concert champêtre. Other paintings in the collection include works by Fra Angelico, Filippino Lippi, Hans Memling, 260 paintings and drawings by François and Jean Clouet, Veronese, Barocci, Annibale Carracci, Domenichino, Salvator Rosa, Nicolas Poussin, Philippe de Champaigne, Van Dyck, Guido Reni, Jean-Baptiste Greuze, Joshua Reynolds, Eugène Delacroix, Ingres, Géricault.

The library of the Petit Château contains over 1,500 manuscripts and 17,500 printed volumes, that is part of the collection of over 700 incunabula, and some 300 medieval manuscripts, including one page of the Registrum Gregorii (c. 983), the Très Riches Heures du Duc de Berry, the Ingeborg Psalter and 40 miniatures from Jean Fouquet's Book of Hours of Etienne Chevalier. Also in the museum's collection is the Chantilly codex (MS 564), the primary manuscript of ars subtilior music, and the treasured library of the Emirate of Abdelkader, a 19th century Sufi emirate in Algeria.

== Selected collection highlights ==
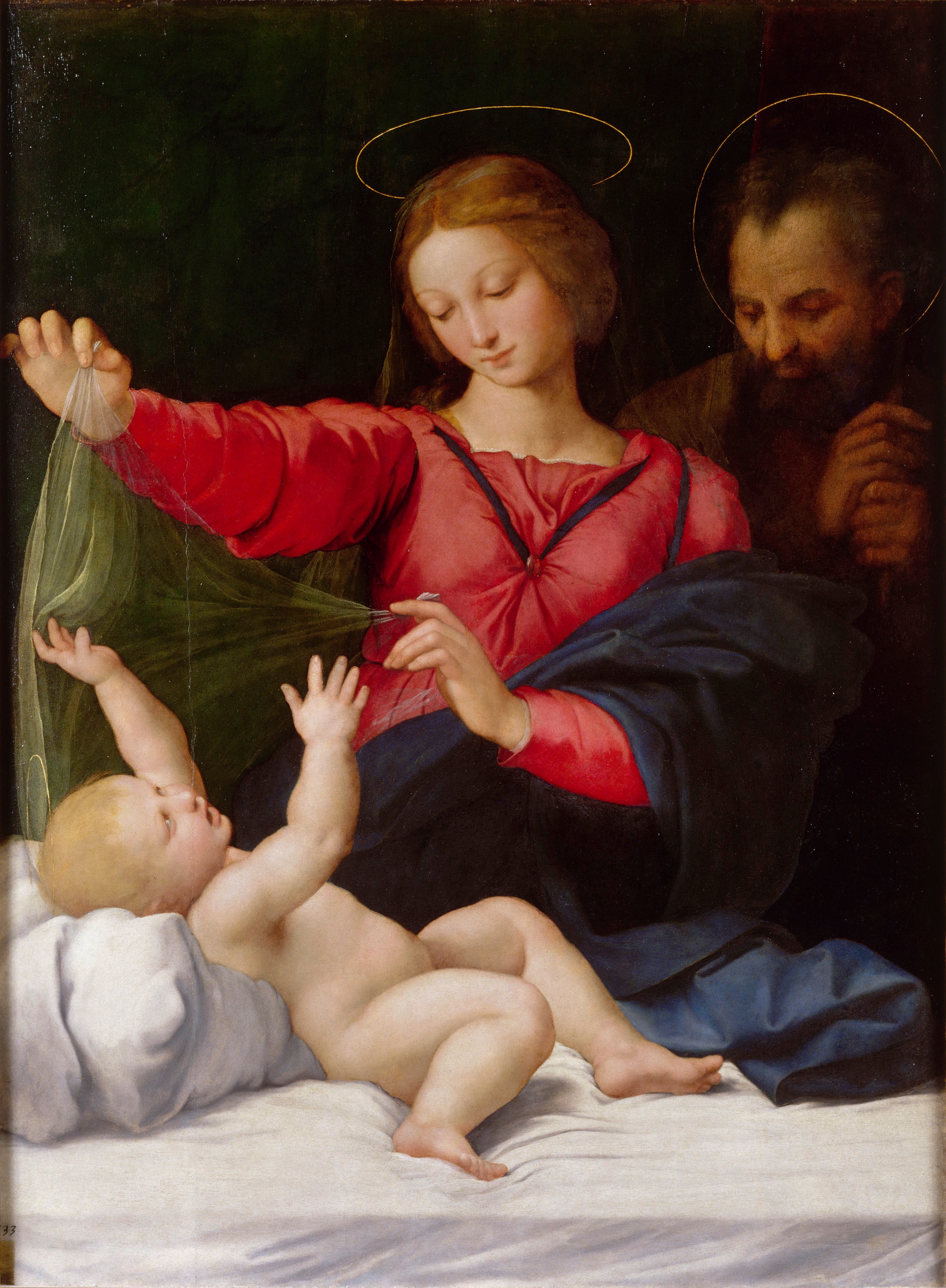
Raphaël, La Madone de Lorette

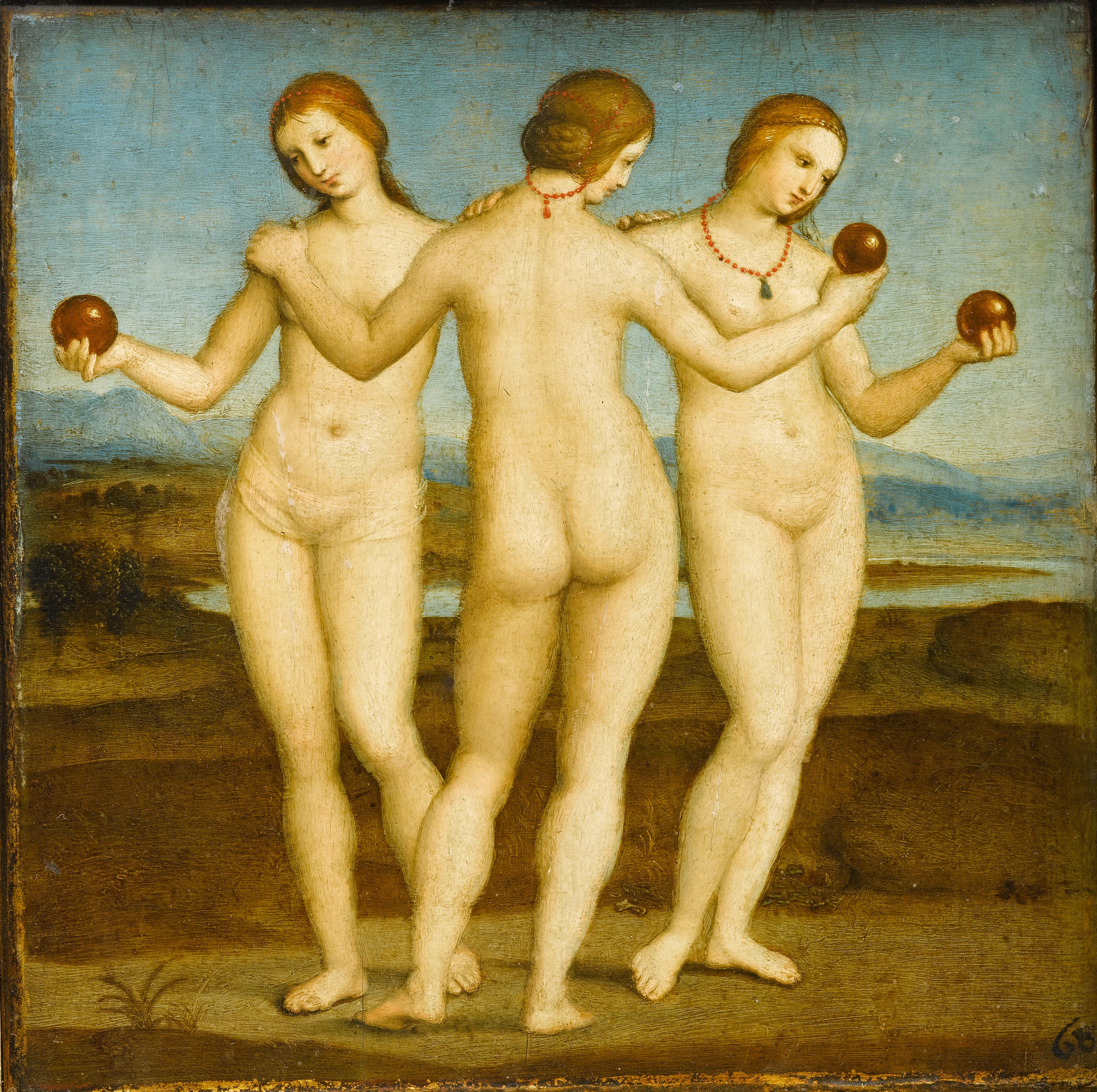
Raphaël, Les Trois Grâces

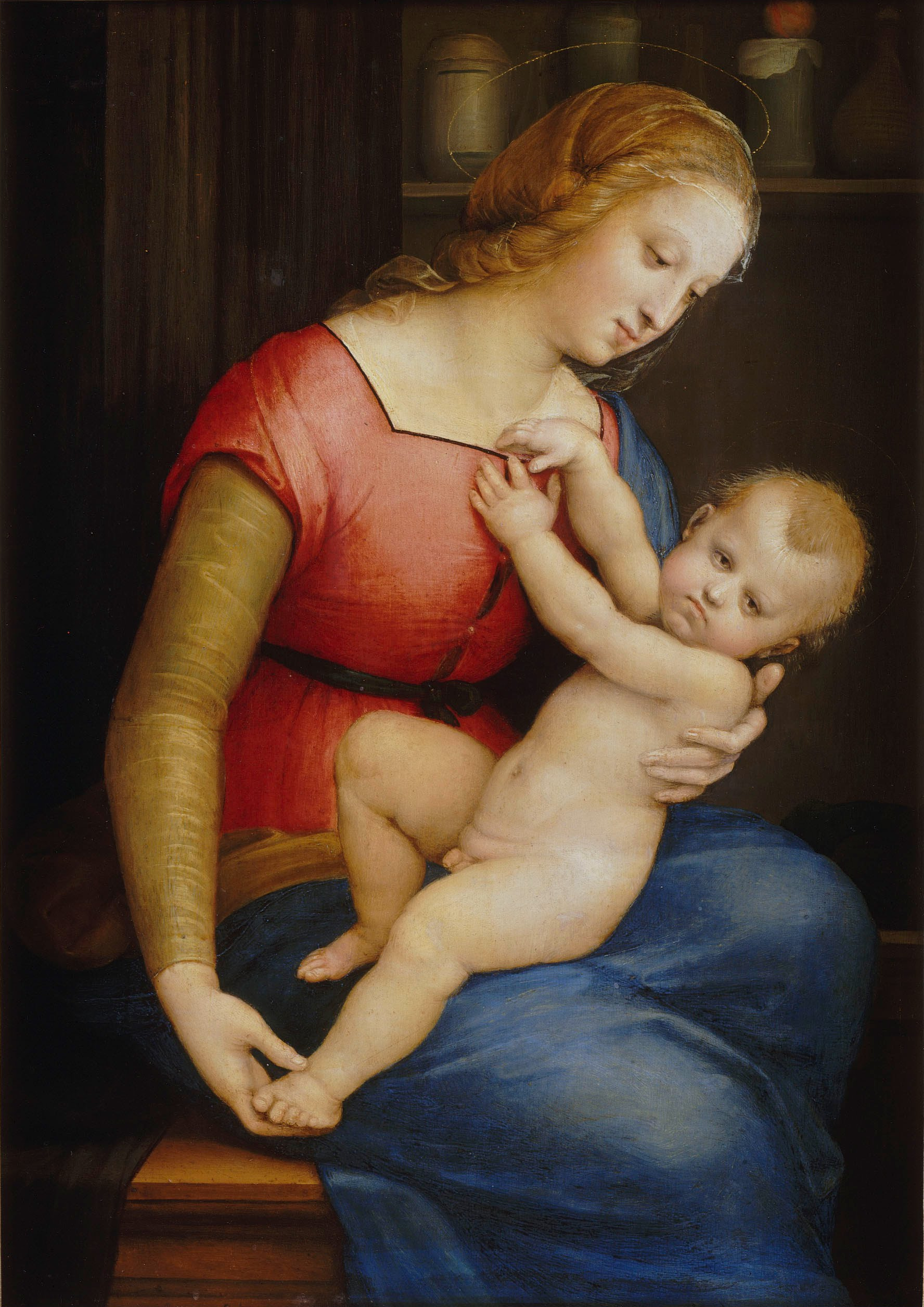
Raphaël, La Madone de la maison d'Orléans

== Park and Chantilly racecourse ==
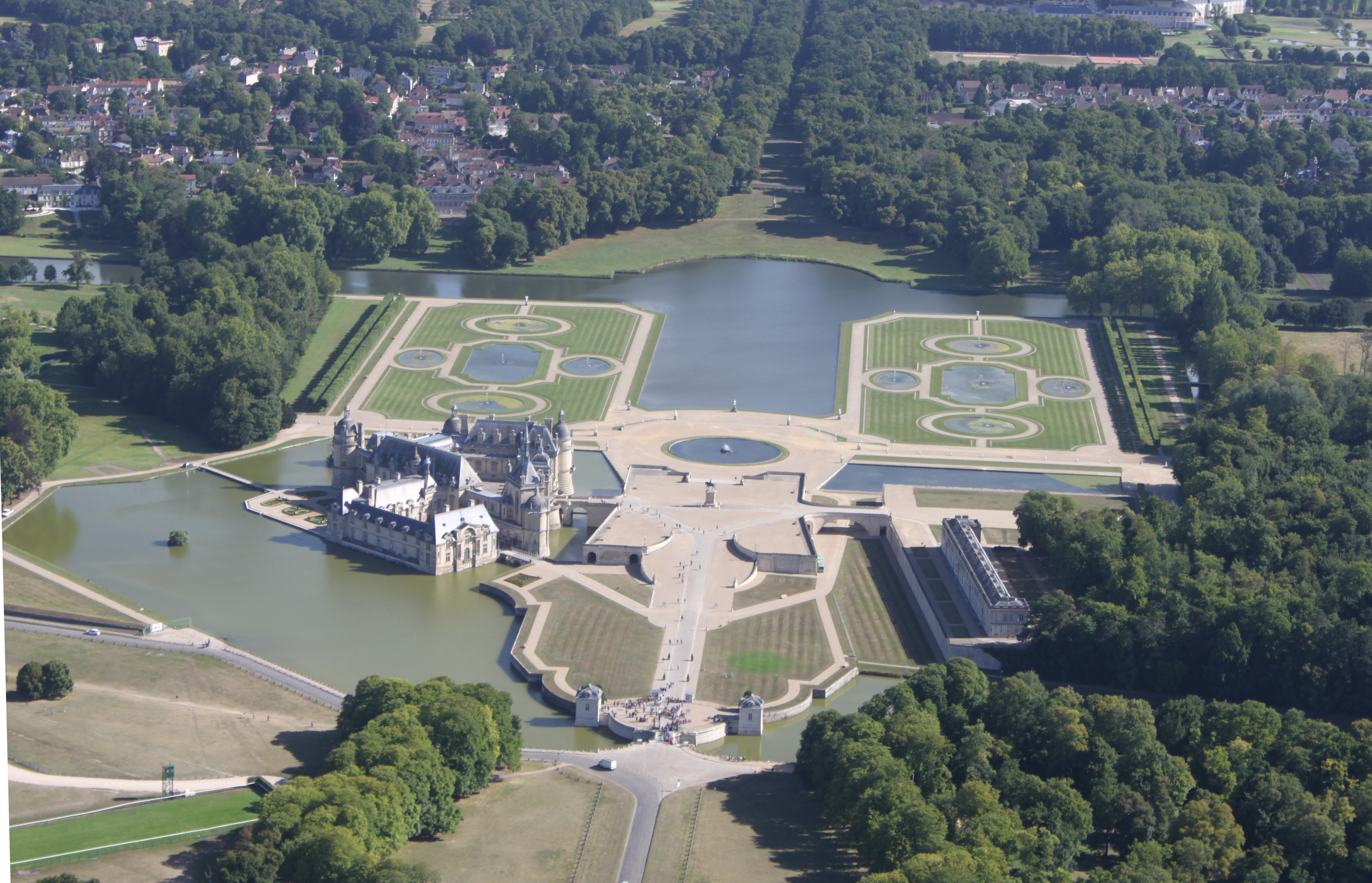
The château seen from above

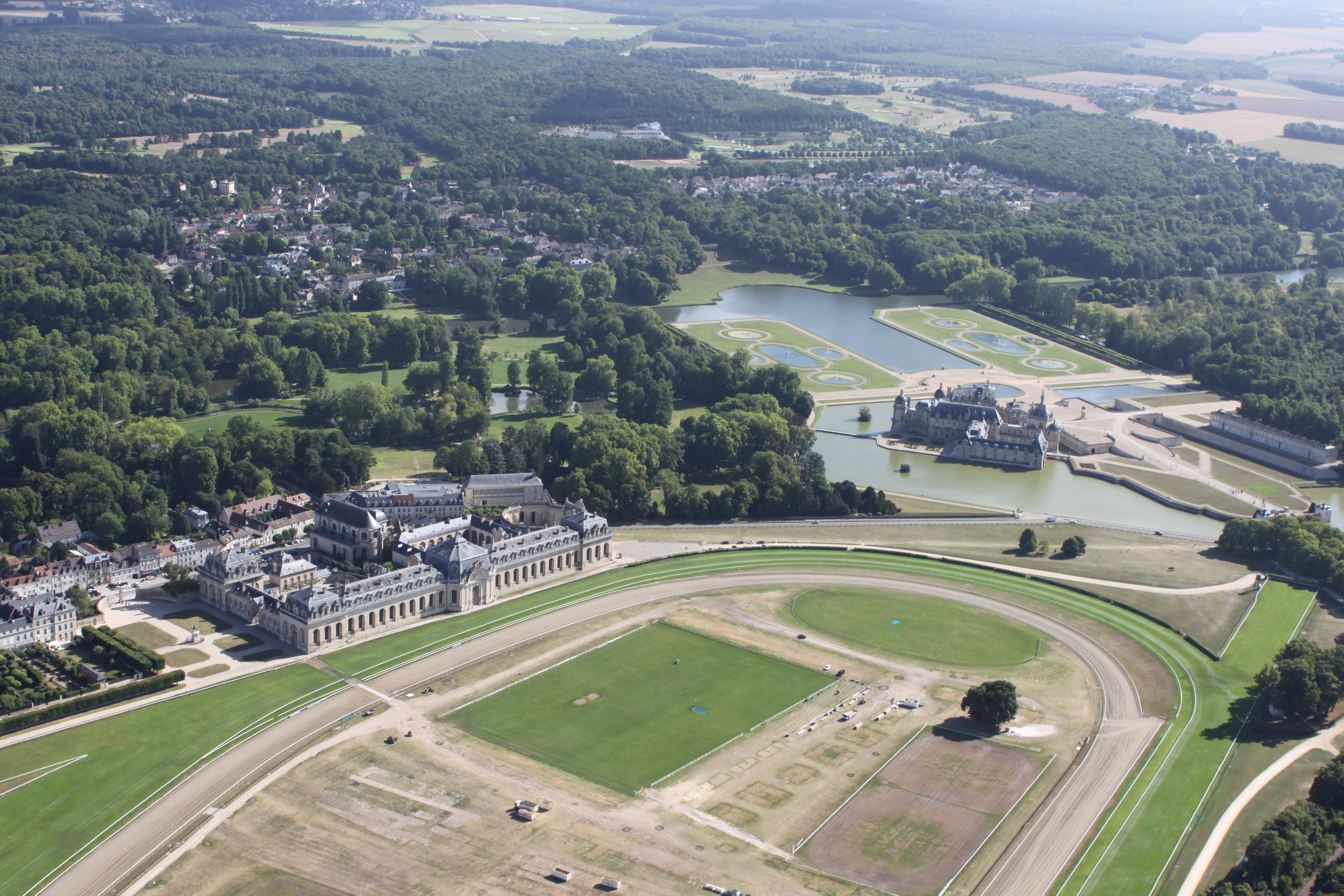
The Grandes Écuries (Great Stables) and the château

The main French formal garden, featuring extensive parterres and water features, was laid out principally by André Le Nôtre for the Grand Condé. The park also contains a French landscape garden with a cascade, pavilions, and a rustic ersatz village, the Hameau de Chantilly. The last of these inspired the Hameau de la reine of Marie Antoinette in the Gardens of Versailles.

The estate overlooks the Chantilly Racecourse and the Grandes Écuries (Great Stables), which contains the Living Museum of the Horse. According to legend, Louis Henri, Duc de Bourbon, Prince of Condé believed that he would be reincarnated as a horse after his death. In 1719, he asked the architect Jean Aubert to build stables suitable to his rank.

== In popular culture ==
- The Molteni Campagnolo cycling team, including star rider Eddy Merckx, are seen riding past the chateau towards the beginning of Jorgen Leth's seminal documentary, A Sunday In Hell, on the way to the start line of the 1976 Paris-Roubaix race.
- The château and the Great Stables were featured in the 1985 James Bond film A View to a Kill, as the home of villainous Max Zorin (played by Christopher Walken) which was being infiltrated by Bond (played for the last time by Roger Moore) in his quest to find out more about Zorin, who had already aroused suspicions of MI6 with various business activities, and ultimately eliminate him.
- Pink Floyd performed, on two consecutive nights, at the château during their The Division Bell tour on 30–31 July 1994.
- Every two years, in June, the "Nuits de Feu" international fireworks competition is held in the château's garden.
- Ronaldo married model and former television host Daniela Cicarelli in the château in 2005. The ceremony reportedly cost €700,000.
- Every May, a rowing regatta, the Trophée des Rois, is held on the grounds. French university crews compete in the 750m race for a trophy.
- The château appeared in the finale of the French reality competition Amazing Race in 2012.
- David Gilmour, guitarist and singer of Pink Floyd, performed at the venue on 16 July 2016 as part of his Rattle That Lock world tour.
- The video game Battlefield 1 features a level that is based around the Château called "Ballroom Blitz".
- The trailer for the finals of the 2019 League of Legends World Championship was filmed inside and around the chateau.
- The fifth leg of The Amazing Race 32 had a Roadblock and a Speed Bump take place on the grounds of the château.
- The castle is a location in the 2022 movie The Gray Man.
- Every year it hosts the Richard Mille Arts&Elegance organized by Peter Auto
- The chateau is the location for the Kommandantur scenes in the 1962 movie The Longest Day (film).

== See also ==
- List of works by Henri Chapu
- Château d'Enghien (Chantilly)

== Sources ==
- Silverman, Debora (1992). Art Nouveau in Fin-de-siècle France: Politics, Psychology, and Style. University of California Press.
