= Louvre Palace =

Building in Paris, France

Coordinates: 48°51′40″N 2°20′11″E

- Palais du Louvre
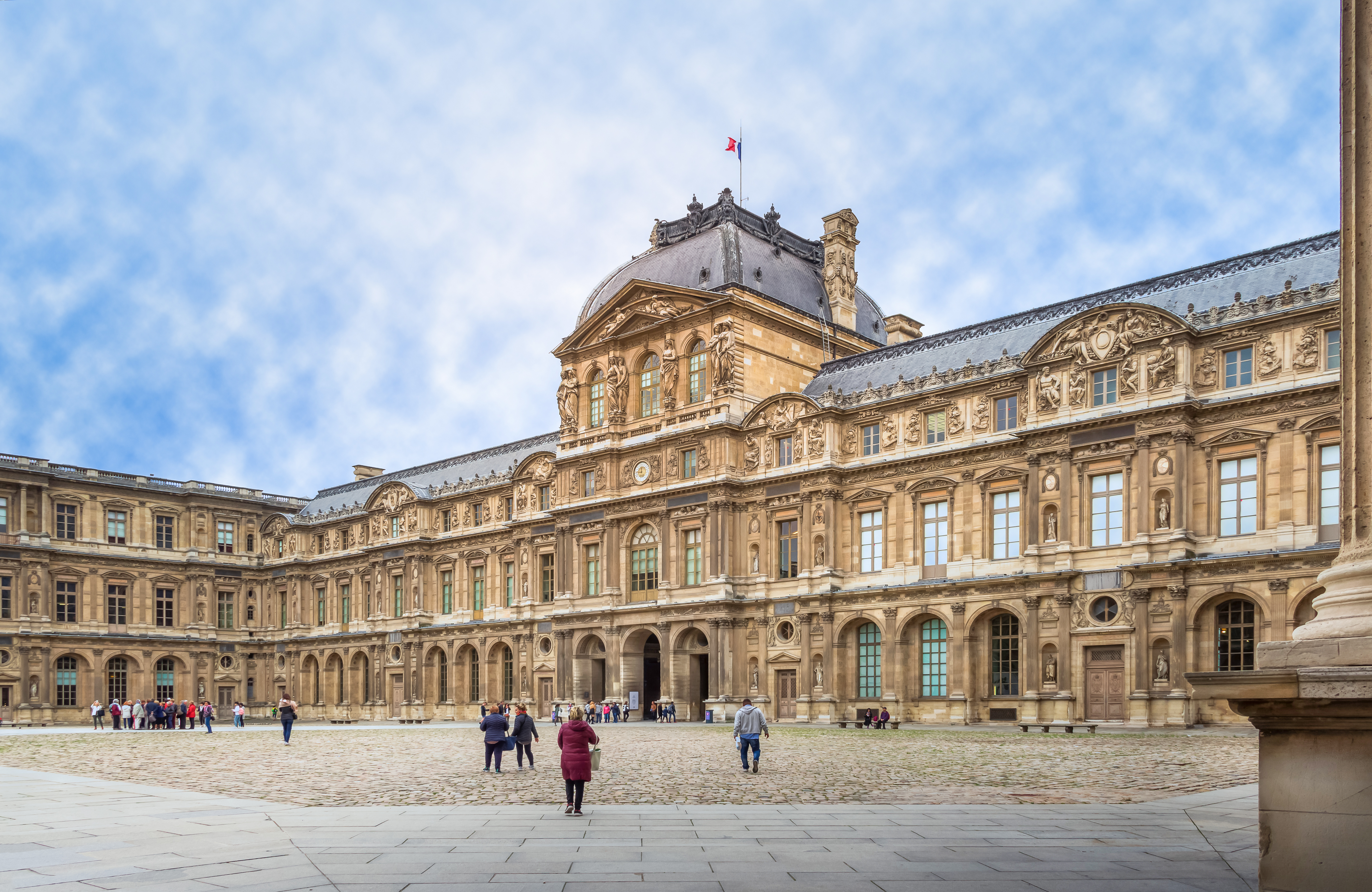
- West wing of the Louvre's Cour Carrée with the Pavillon de l'Horloge
- Interactive map of the Louvre Palace area

General information
- Type: Royal residence
- Architectural style: Gothic (remains preserved underground), French Renaissance, Louis XIII style, French Baroque, Neoclassical, Neo-Baroque and Second Empire style, and Modernism (Pyramid)
- Location: Rue de Rivoli, 75001 Paris, France
- Current tenants: Louvre, Musée des Arts Décoratifs, École du Louvre, Center for Research and Restoration of Museums of France
- Construction started: 1190 together with the Wall of Philip II Augustus

Technical details
- Floor area: 244,000 m2.

Design and construction
- Architects: Numerous; include Pierre Lescot, Louis Métezeau, Jacques Lemercier, Louis Le Vau, Claude Perrault, Percier and Fontaine, Louis Visconti, Hector Lefuel, I. M. Pei

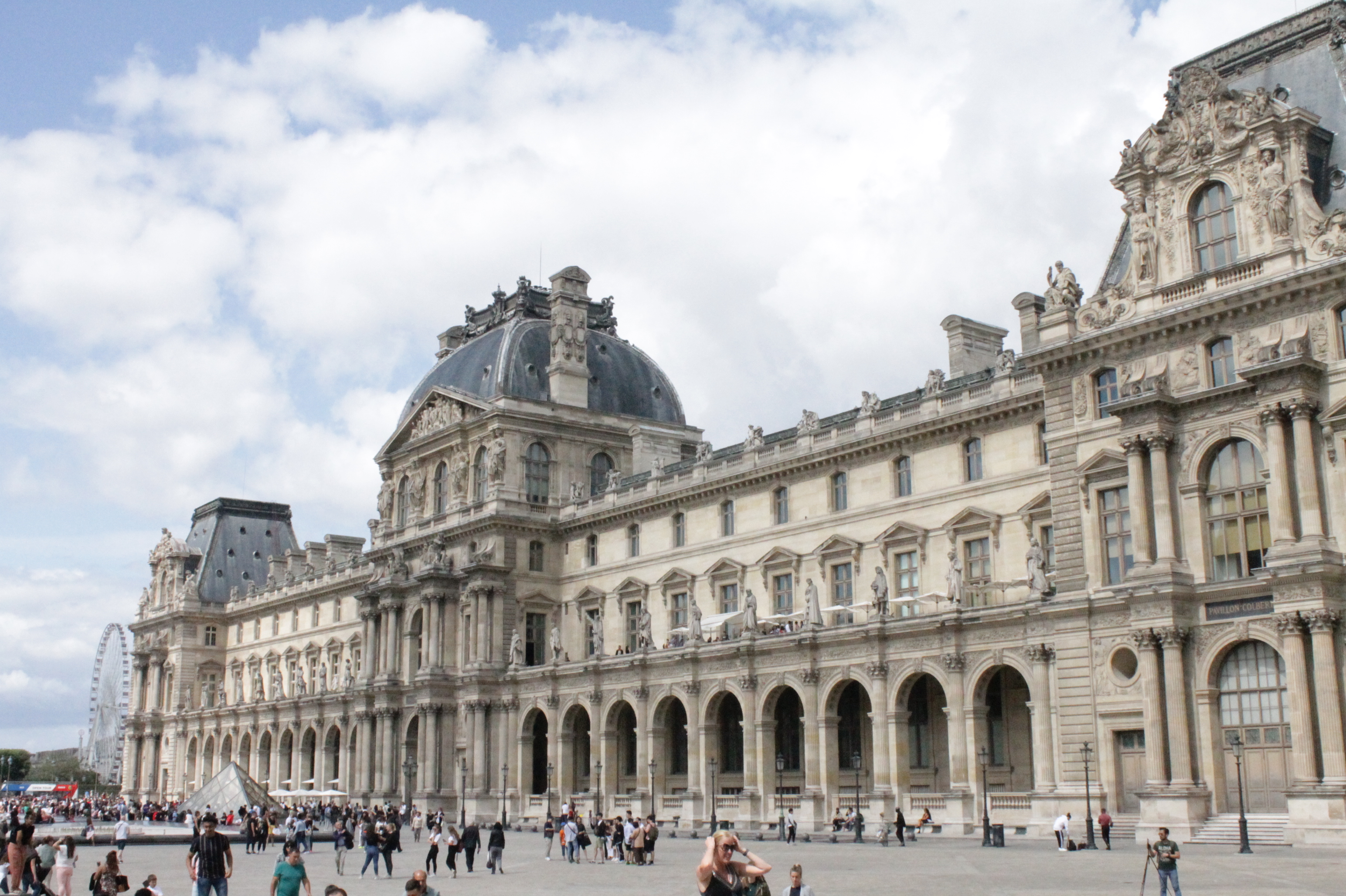
North wing of Louvre facing main courtyard

The Louvre Palace (French: Palais du Louvre, [palɛ dy luvʁ]), often referred to simply as the Louvre, is a palace located on the Right Bank of the Seine in Paris, occupying a large expanse of land between the Tuileries Gardens and the church of Saint-Germain l'Auxerrois. Originally a defensive castle, it has served several government-related functions in the past, including intermittently as a royal residence between the 14th and 18th centuries. It is now mostly used by the Louvre Museum, which first opened there in 1793.

While this area along the Seine had been inhabited for thousands of years, the Louvre's history starts around 1190 with its first construction as the Louvre Castle defending the western front of the Wall of Philip II Augustus, the then new city-wall of Paris. The Louvre's oldest section still standing above ground, its palatial Lescot Wing, dates from the late 1540s, when Francis I started the replacement of the greatly expanded medieval castle with a new design inspired by classical antiquity and Italian Renaissance architecture. Most parts of the current building were constructed in the 17th and 19th centuries. In the late 20th century, the Grand Louvre project increased visitor access and gallery space, including by adding the Louvre Pyramid in the courtyard Cour Napoléon.

For more than three centuries, the history and design of the Louvre was closely intertwined with that of the Tuileries Palace, created to the west of the Louvre by Queen Catherine de' Medici in 1564, with its main block finally demolished in 1883. The French Renaissance style Tuileries was the premier seat of French executive power during the last third of that period, from the return of Louis XVI and his court from Versailles in October 1789 until the palace was set on fire during the Paris Commune of 1871. The Louvre and Tuileries became physically connected as part of the project called the "Grand Design", with the completion of the Pavillon de Flore in the early 1600s. The Pavillon de Flore and Pavillon de Marsan, which used to respectively mark the southern and northern ends of the Tuileries Palace, are now considered part of the Louvre Palace. The Carrousel Garden, first created in the late 19th century (during Napoleon III's Louvre expansion) in what used to be the great courtyard of the Tuileries (or Cour du Carrousel), is now considered part of the Tuileries Garden.

A less high-profile but historically significant dependency of the Louvre was to its immediate east, the Hôtel du Petit-Bourbon, appropriated by the monarchy following the betrayal of the Constable of Bourbon in 1523 and mostly demolished in October 1660 to give way to the Louvre's expansion. The last remains of the Petit-Bourbon were cleared in the 1760s. Today, the palace has a total floor area of 244,000 m2.

== General description ==
This section provides a summary description of the present-day complex and its main constituent parts.

=== Location and layout ===
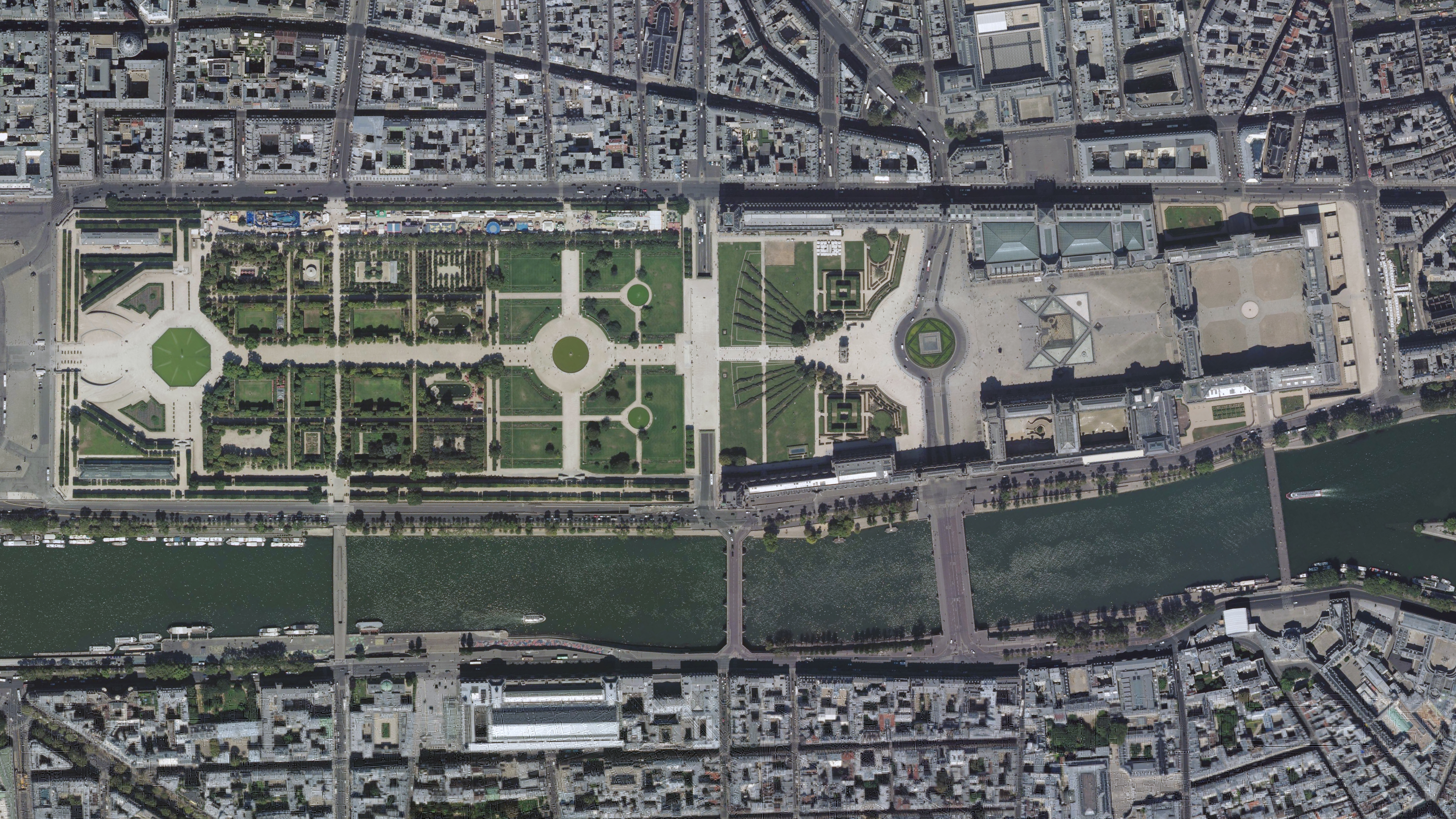
Aerial view of the Louvre Palace (right) and the Tuileries Garden (left) in 2018

Map of the modern Louvre Palace complex

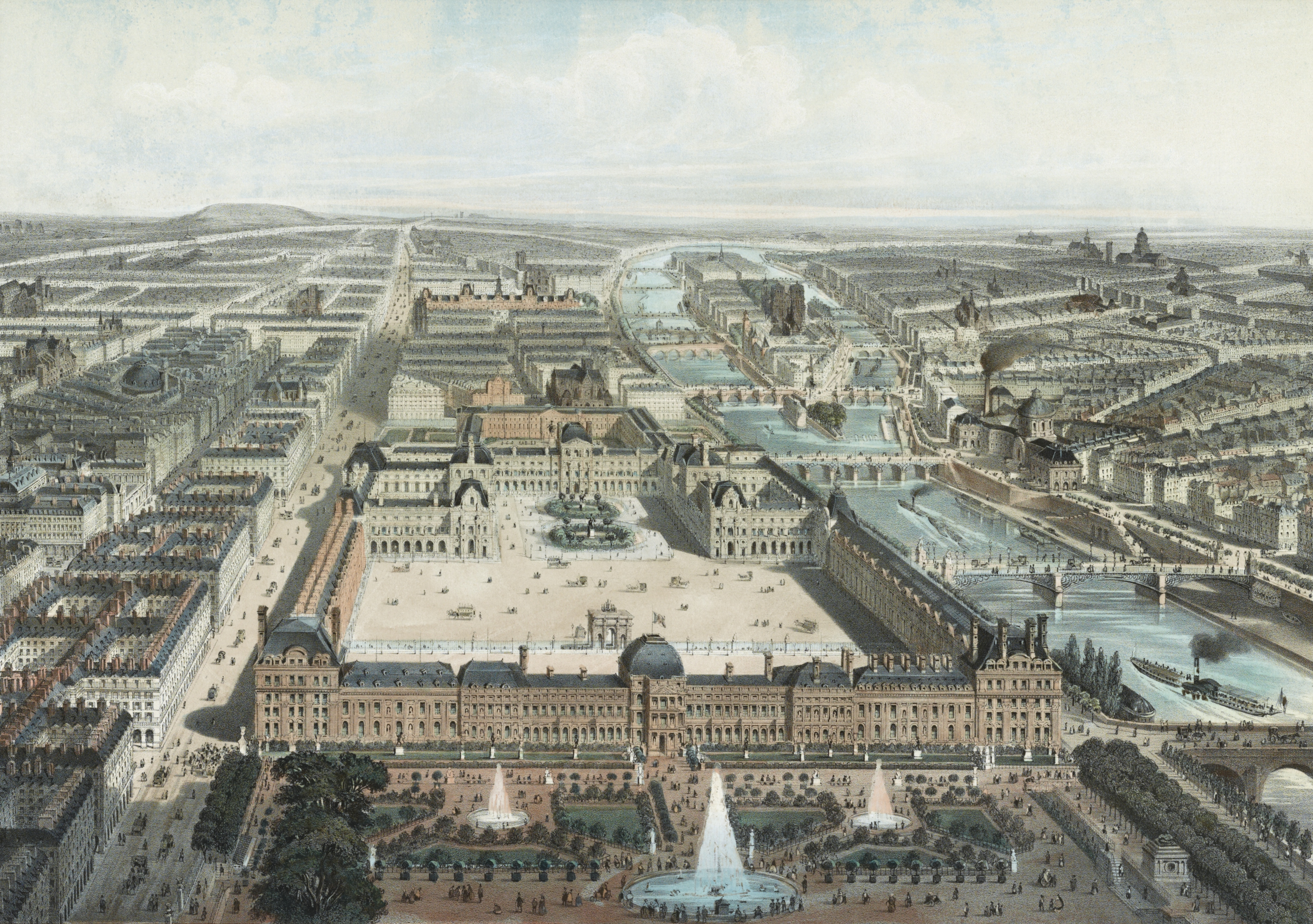
The Louvre Palace (center) and the Tuileries Palace front (burned 1870s) circa 1850

The Louvre Palace is situated on the right bank of the Seine, between the Quai François Mitterrand to its south, the Avenue du Général-Lemonnier to its west (thus named since 1957; formerly rue des Tuileries and Avenue Paul-Déroulède, converted into an underpass in 1987–1989), the Rue de Rivoli to its north, and the Place du Louvre to its east. The complex occupies about 40 hectares with buildings distributed around three main open spaces: the eastern Cour Carrée (square courtyard), which is closed by four wings that form the square of its name, the central Cour Napoléon, which is open on its western side onto the thoroughfare known as Place du Carrousel, towards the Carrousel Garden. The rest of the Tuileries Garden lies beyond that.

The Louvre is slightly askew of the Historic Axis (Axe historique), a roughly eight-kilometer (five-mile) architectural line bisecting the city. The axis begins with the Louvre courtyard, at a point now symbolically marked by a lead copy of Bernini's equestrian statue of Louis XIV, and runs west along the Champs-Élysées to La Défense and slightly beyond.

Since 1988, the Louvre Pyramid in the middle of the Cour Napoléon has marked the center of the Louvre complex. At the same time, the Louvre Museum has adopted a toponymy developed by the Carbone Smolan Agency to refer to the three clusters of buildings that surround that central focus point:

- To the east, the "Sully Wing" is the square-shaped set of buildings that surrounds the Cour Carrée, named after Maximilien de Béthune, Duke of Sully. It includes the 16th-century Lescot Wing and the footprint of the Medieval Louvre whose remains are displayed underground;
- To the south, the "Denon Wing" is the array of buildings between the Cour Napoléon and the Seine, named after the Louvre's first director Vivant Denon. the Louvre's southwestern wing is the Aile de Flore. The long Grande Galerie runs on the first floor for much of the length of this building, on the Seine-facing side.
- To the north, the "Richelieu Wing" is the almost-symmetrical array of buildings between the Cour Napoléon and the rue de Rivoli, named after Cardinal Richelieu. Its western extension alongside rue de Rivoli is the Aile de Rohan, itself continued by the Aile de Marsan.

The Louvre Museum occupies most of the palace's space, but not all of it. The main other users are at the building's two western tips: in the southwestern Aile de Flore, the École du Louvre and Center for Research and Restoration of Museums of France (C2RMF); and in the northwestern Aile de Marsan, the Musée des Arts Décoratifs. In total, some 51,615 square meters (555,000 square feet) in the palace complex are devoted to public exhibition floor space.

Many sections of the Louvre are referred to as "wings" (ailes) and "pavilions" (pavillons) – typically, the pavilions are the blocks at either the end or the center of a wing. In the Louvre's context, the word "wing" does not denote a peripheral location: the Lescot Wing, in particular, was built as the Louvre's main corps de logis. Given the Louvre wings' length and the fact that they typically abutted parts of the city with streets and private buildings, several of them have passageways on the ground floor which in the Louvre's specific context are called guichets.

=== Toponymy ===
The origin of the name Louvre is unclear. French historian Henri Sauval, probably writing in the 1660s, stated that he had seen "in an old Latin-Saxon glossary, Leouar is translated castle" and thus took Leouar to be the origin of Louvre. According to Keith Briggs, Sauval's theory is often repeated, even in recent books, but this glossary has never been seen again, and Sauval's idea is viewed as obsolete. Briggs suggests that H. J. Wolf's proposal in 1969 that Louvre derives instead from Latin Rubras, meaning "red soil", is more plausible. David Hanser suggests instead that the word may come from French louveterie, a "place where dogs were trained to chase wolves".

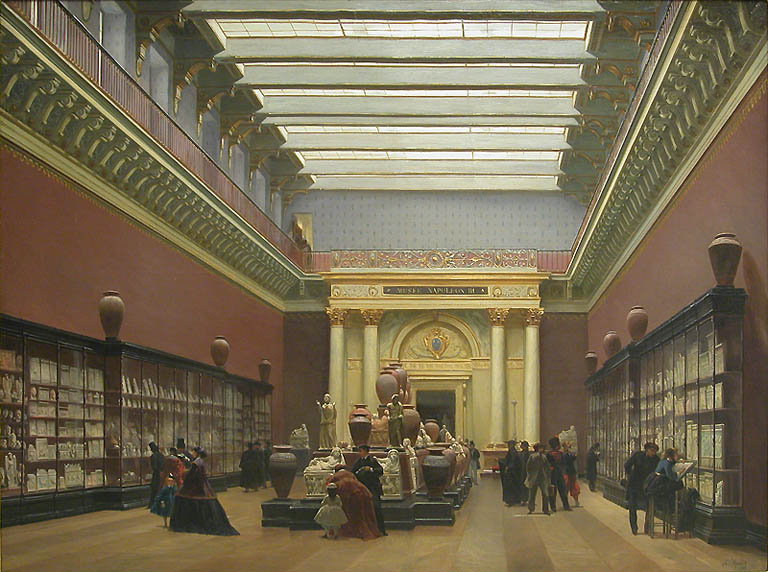
La salle des terres cuites du musée Napoléon III au Louvre, by Sébastien Charles Giraud, Salon of 1866

Beyond the name of the palace itself, the toponymy of the Louvre can be treacherous. Partly because of the building's long history and links to changing politics, different names have applied at different times to the same structures or rooms. For example, what used to be known in the 17th and 18th centuries the Pavillon du Milieu or Gros Pavillon is now generally referred to as Pavillon de l'Horloge, or Pavillon Sully (especially when considered from the west), or also Pavillon Lemercier after the architect Jacques Lemercier who first designed it in 1624. In some cases, the same name has designated different parts of the building at different times. For example, in the 19th century, the Pavillon de la Bibliothèque referred to what was later called the Porte Jean-Goujon (still later, Porte Barbet-de-Jouy), on the south side of the Grande Galerie facing the Seine, before becoming the name for the main pavilion of the Richelieu Wing On the rue de Rivoli, its exact symmetrical point from the Louvre Pyramid. The main room on the first floor of the Lescot Wing has been the Salle Haute, Grande Salle, Salle des Gardes, Salle d'Attente, in the 16th and 17th centuries. It was fragmented into apartments during the 18th century, then recreated in the early 19th and called successively Salle Royale, Salle des Séances Royales or Salle des Etats (the latter also being the name of two other ceremonial rooms, created in the 1850s and 1860s respectively); then as part of the museum, salle des terres cuites, after 1871 Salle La Caze in honor of donor Louis La Caze, Salle des Bronzes, and since 2021 Salle Etrusque. The room immediately below, now known as Salle des Caryatides, has also been called Salle Basse, Salle Basse des Suisses, Grande Salle, Salle des Gardes, Salle des Antiques (from 1692 to 1793), and Salle des Fleuves in the past, among other names.

=== Sully Wing ===
The Sully Wing forms a square of approximately 160 m (520 ft) side length. The protruding sections at the corners and center of each side are known as pavillons. Clockwise from the northwest corner, they are named as follows: Pavillon de Beauvais (after a now-disappeared street), Pavillon Marengo (after the nearby rue de Marengo), Pavillon Nord-Est (also Pavillon des Assyriens), Pavillon Central de la Colonnade (also Pavillon Saint-Germain-l'Auxerrois), Pavillon Sud-Est (also Pavillon des Egyptiens), Pavillon des Arts, Pavillon du Roi, and Pavillon de l'Horloge, the latter also known as Pavillon Sully. The section between the Pavillon du Roi and the Pavillon Sully, known as the Lescot Wing (Aile Lescot) as it was designed by architect Pierre Lescot, is the oldest standing part of the entire Louvre Palace. The section between the Pavillon Sully and the Pavillon de Beauvais, which was modeled after the Lescot Wing by architect Jacques Lemercier, is similarly known as the Lemercier Wing (Aile Lemercier). The eastern wing is the Aile de la Colonnade, named after its iconic eastern façade, the Louvre Colonnade.

=== Denon and Flore Wings ===
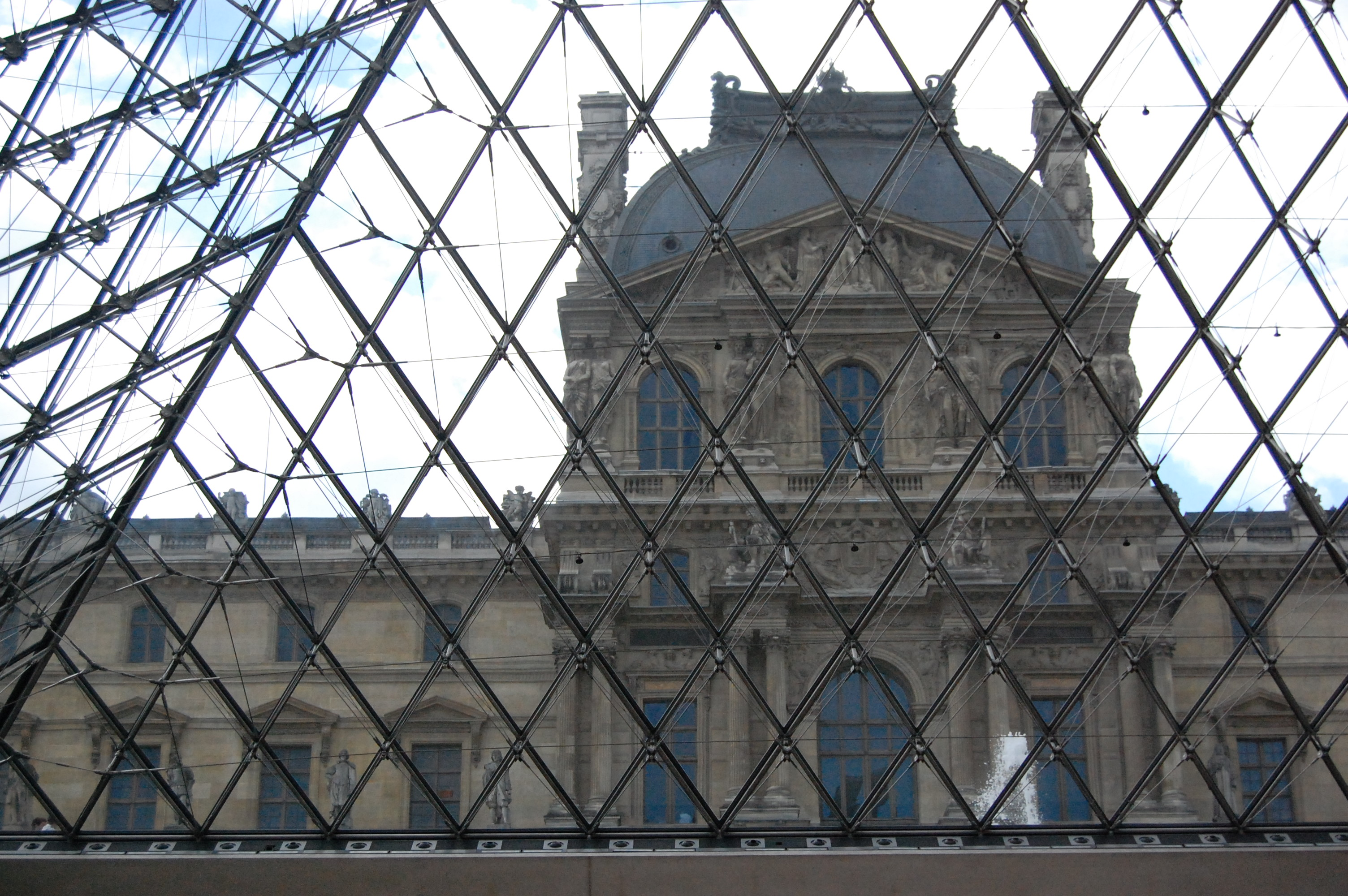
View of the Pavillon Denon from the underground lobby of the Pyramid

On the southern side of the Cour Napoléon, the Denon Wing's three main pavilions are named respectively, from east to west, after Napoleon-era officials Pierre Daru, Vivant Denon and Nicolas François Mollien. Between these and the wing facing the seine are three courtyards, from east to west the Cour du Sphinx (covered as a glass atrium since 1934), Cour Visconti (ground floor covered since 2012), and Cour Lefuel. On the side of the Seine, this wing starts with the north–south Petite Galerie bordering a side garden known as the Jardin de l'Infante, and continues westwards along the Quai François Mitterrand with the Salon Carré, Grande Galerie, and Pavillon de Flore. In the middle of the Grande Galerie are the Guichets du Carrousel, a composition of three monumental arches flanked by two narrow pavilions named respectively after the Duke of Lesdiguières and Henri de La Trémoille (Pavillon Lesdiguières and Pavillon La Trémoille). Further west are the Pavillon des Sessions, a protruding structure on the northern side, the Porte des Lions, a passageway to the quay, the Porte Jaujard on the north side, now the main entrance to the École du Louvre, and finally the Pavillon de Flore.

=== Richelieu and Marsan Wings ===
Similarly, on the northern side of the Cour Napoléon are, from east to west, the pavilions named after Jean-Baptiste Colbert, Cardinal Richelieu, and Anne Robert Jacques Turgot. Between these and the rue de Rivoli are three courtyards, from east to west the Cour Khorsabad (formerly Cour de la Poste), Cour Puget (formerly Cour des Guichets or Cour de l'Horloge), and Cour Marly (formerly Cour d'Honneur or Cour du Ministre). On the side facing the rue de Rivoli, the main salient feature is the Pavillon de la Bibliothèque, which connects to the Pavillon Richelieu through the ground-floor Passage Richelieu (formerly Guichet du Ministère) between the Cour Puget and Cour Marly. Further west are the Pavillon de Rohan and the Aile de Rohan, built in the early 19th century and named after the nearby rue de Rohan, then the Aile de Marsan and the Pavillon de Marsan, both rebuilt by Hector Lefuel in the 1870s.

=== Pyramid and underground spaces ===
The Louvre Pyramid, built in the 1980s on a design by I. M. Pei, is now the centerpiece of the entire Louvre complex. It leads to the underground Hall Napoléon which in turn serves a vast complex of underground spaces, including the Carrousel du Louvre commercial mall around an inverted pyramid further west.

=== Architectural style ===
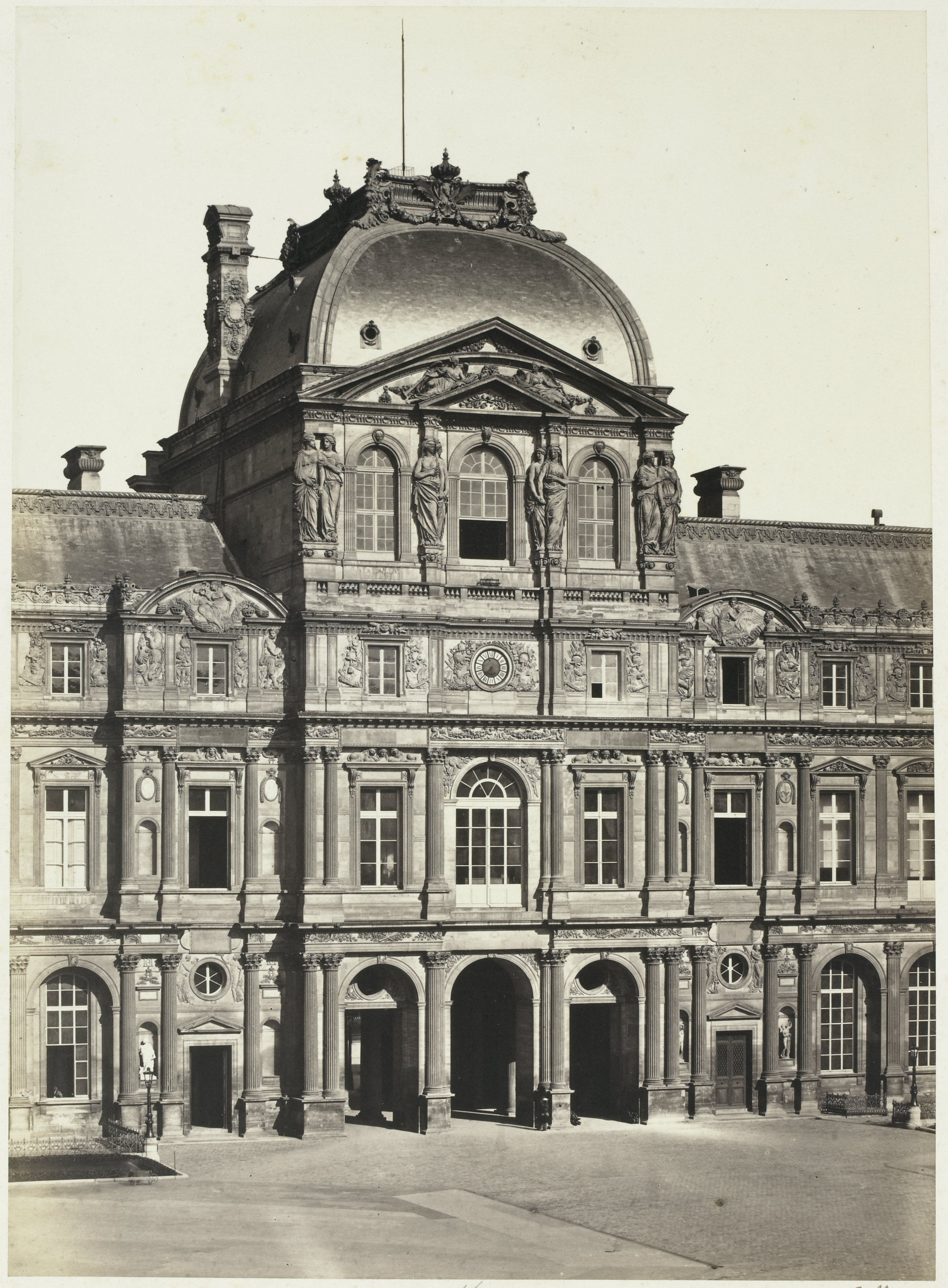
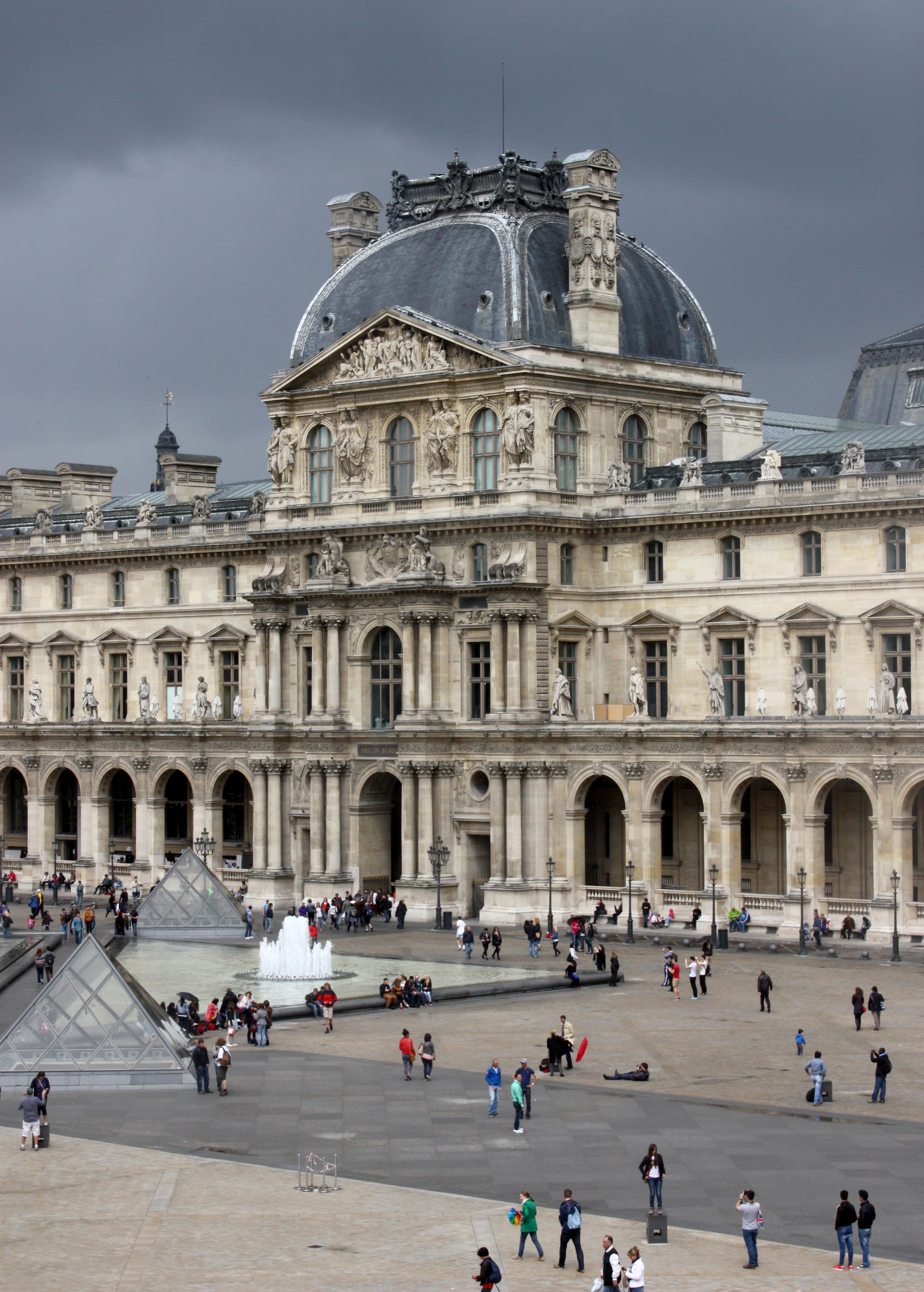
The Louvre's Pavillon de l'Horloge (designed in 1624) and Pavillon Richelieu (designed in 1852–1854)

The present-day Louvre Palace is a vast complex of wings and pavilions which, although superficially homogeneous in scale and architecture, is the result of many phases of building, modification, destruction and reconstruction. Its apparent stylistic consistency is largely due to conscious efforts of architects over several centuries to echo each other's work and preserve a strong sense of historical continuity, mirroring that of the French monarchy and state; American essayist Adam Gopnik has written that "The continuity the Louvre represents is the continuity of the French state." For example, from the 1620s to the 1650s Jacques Lemercier thoroughly replicated the Lescot Wing's patterns for his design of the northern half of the western wing of the Cour Carrée. In the 1660s Louis Le Vau echoed Lemercier's Pavillon de l'Horloge for his redesign of the central pavillon of the Tuileries Palace further west (burnt in 1871 and demolished in 1883), and mostly continued Lescot's and Lemercier's pattern for the completion of the Cour Carrée. A separate design a few years later for the Louvre Colonnade, included window shapes on the ground level based on Lescot's for the Pavillon du Roi a century earlier, ensuring visual continuity even though the dramatic colonnade on the upper level was different from anything that had been done at the Louvre so far. In the 1810s, Percier and Fontaine copied the giant order of the western section of the Grande Galerie, built in the early 17th century and attributed to Jacques II Androuet du Cerceau, for their design of the northern wing to connect the Tuileries with the Louvre along the rue de Rivoli. In the 1850s during Napoleon III's Louvre expansion, architects Louis Visconti then Hector Lefuel built the Denon and Richelieu pavilions as echoes of Lemercier's Pavillon de l'Horloge. In the 1860s and 1870s, Lefuel used designs inspired by the Lescot Wing even as he replaced the prior giant-order patterns created by Androuet du Cerceau and replicated by Percier and Fontaine. Finally, in the 1980s, I. M. Pei made explicit reference to André Le Nôtre, the designer of the Tuileries Garden, for his design of the Louvre Pyramid.

== Building history ==
No fewer than twenty building campaigns have been identified in the history of the Louvre Palace. The architect of the largest such campaign, Hector Lefuel, crisply summarized the identity of the complex by noting: "Le Louvre est un monument qui a vécu" (translatable as "The Louvre is a building that has gone through a lot"). In the early 1920s Henri Verne, who would soon become the Louvre's Director, noted that "it has become, through the very slow pace of its development, the most representative monument of our national life."

=== Late 12th and 13th centuries ===
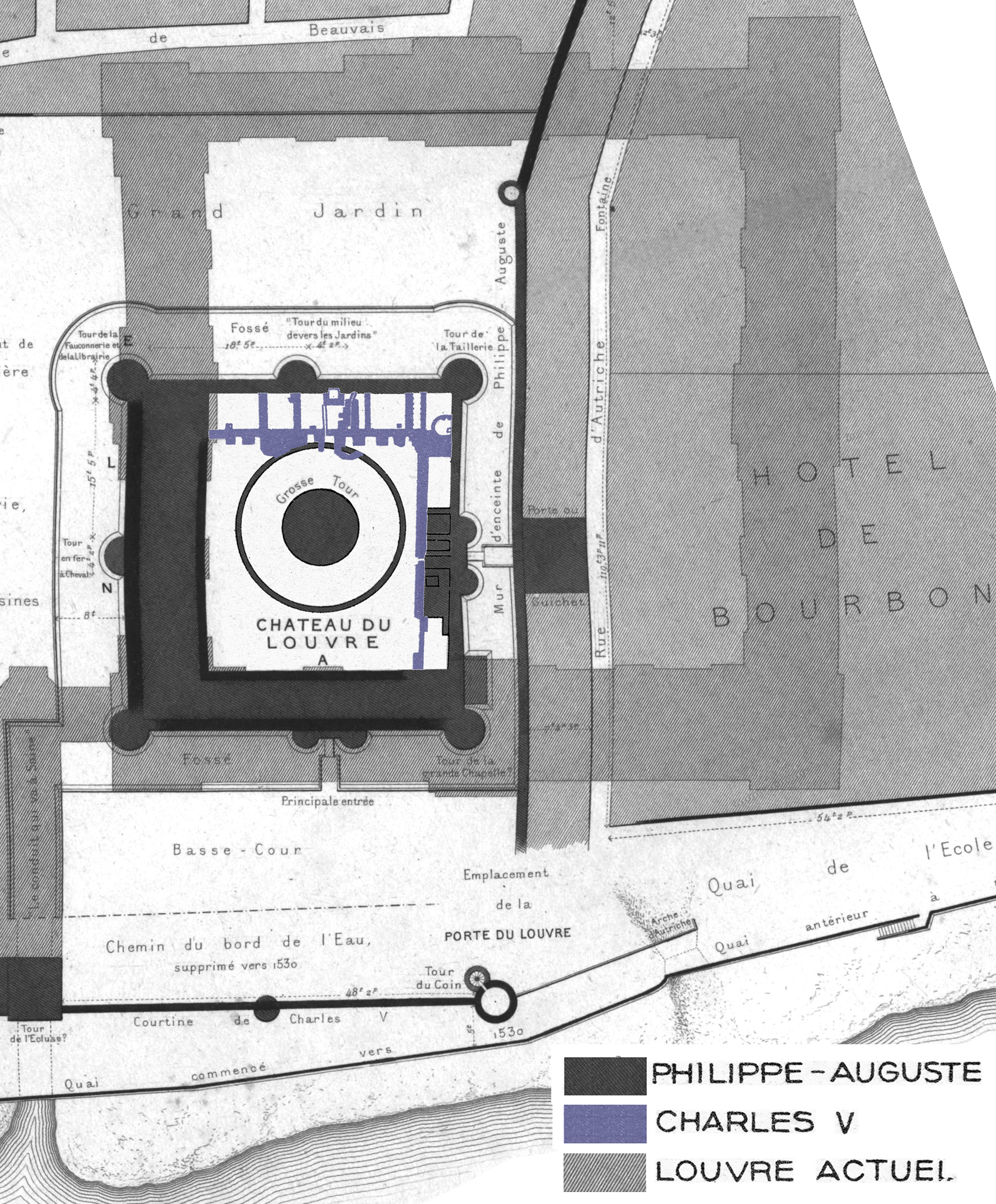
Plan of the medieval Louvre and wall of Philippe Auguste with additions to the Louvre made during the reign of Charles V, with indication of the footprint of later buildings

In 1190 King Philip II of France, who was about to leave for the Third Crusade, ordered the construction of a defensive wall all around Paris. To protect the city, he opted to build the Louvre as a fortress just outside the wall's junction with the Seine on its right bank, on the road to the Duchy of Normandy that was still controlled by his English rivals. Completed in 1202, the new fortress was situated in what is now the southwest quadrant of the Cour Carrée, and some of its remains, excavated between late 1983 and late 1985, are conserved underground.

The original Louvre was nearly square in plan, at seventy-eight by seventy-two meters, and enclosed by a 2.6-metre thick crenellated and machicolated curtain wall. The entire structure was surrounded by a water-filled moat. On the outside of the walls were ten round defensive towers: one at each corner and at the center of the northern and western sides, and two pairs respectively flanking the narrow gates on the southern and eastern sides.

In the courtyard, slightly offset to the northeast, was the cylindrical keep or donjon, known as the Grosse Tour du Louvre (Great Tower of the Louvre), thirty meters high and fifteen meters wide with 4-meter-thick external walls. The keep was encircled by a deep, dry ditch with stone counterscarps to help prevent the scaling of its walls with ladders. Accommodations in the fortress were supplied by the vaulted chambers of the keep as well as two wings built against the insides of the curtain walls of the western and southern sides. The circular plans of the towers and the keep avoided the dead angles created by square or rectangular designs which allowed attackers to approach out of firing range. Cylindrical keeps were typical of French castles at the time, but few were as large as the Louvre's Grosse Tour.

Louis IX added constructions in the 1230s, included the medieval Louvre's main ceremonial room or Grande Salle in which several historical events took place, and the castle's first chapel. The partly preserved basement part of that program was rediscovered during heating installations at the Louvre in 1882–1883, and has since then been known successively as the Salle de Philippe Auguste and, after renovation in the 1980s, as the Salle Saint-Louis.

=== 14th century ===
In the late 1350s, the growth of the city and the insecurity brought by the Hundred Years' War led Etienne Marcel, provost of the merchants (i.e. municipal leader) of Paris, to initiate the construction of a new protective wall beyond that of Philip II. King Charles V continued the project in the 1360s, and it was later known as the Wall of Charles V. From its westernmost point at the Tour du Bois, the new wall extended east along the north bank of the Seine to the old wall, enclosing the Louvre and greatly reducing its military value. Remains of that wall have been uncovered and reconstructed in the present-day Louvre's Carrousel du Louvre.

Shortly after becoming king in 1364 Charles V abandoned the Palais de la Cité, which he associated with the insurgency led by Etienne Marcel, and made the Louvre into a royal residence for the first time, with the transformation designed by his architect Raymond du Temple. This was a political statement as well as a utility project – one scholar wrote that Charles V "made the Louvre his political manifesto in stone" and referred to it as "a remarkably discursive monument-a form of architectural rhetoric that proclaimed the revitalization of France after years of internal strife and external menace." The curtain wall was pierced with windows, new wings added to the courtyard, and elaborate chimneys, turrets, and pinnacles to the top. Known as the joli Louvre ("pretty Louvre"), Charles V's palace was memorably pictured in the illustration The Month of October of the Très Riches Heures du Duc de Berry.

=== 15th century ===
In the late 14th and early 15th centuries, the preferred royal residence in Paris was the Hôtel Saint-Pol in what became the Marais, until the Armagnac–Burgundian Civil War resulted in the monarchy leaving Paris altogether; in the 1420s and 1430s Charles VII resided largely at or near Bourges, whereas his rival English claimant Henry VI's representative, the Duke of Bedford, generally resided in his base of Rouen, and while in Paris in his Hôtel des Tournelles. Even after Charles VII's ceremonial entry into Paris in 1437 and after the effective end of the Hundred Years' War in 1453, French monarchs preferred residing in the Châteaux of the Loire Valley, the Palace of Fontainebleau or, when in Paris, at the Château de Vincennes or the Hôtel des Tournelles. Meanwhile, the Louvre Castle was left in a state of increasing disrepair, even as it remained used as an arsenal and prison.

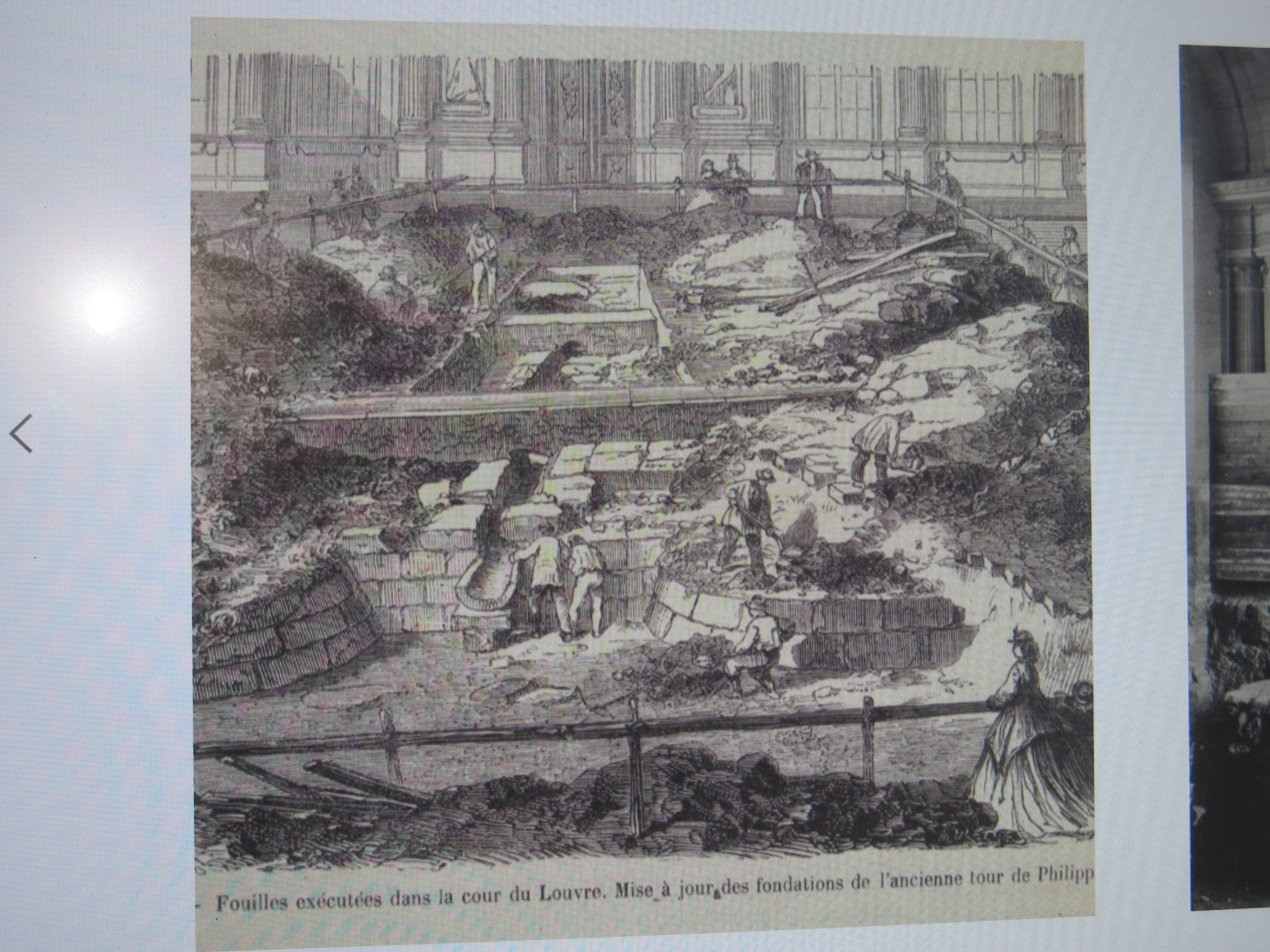
First excavation of the medieval Louvre by Adolphe Berty in 1866

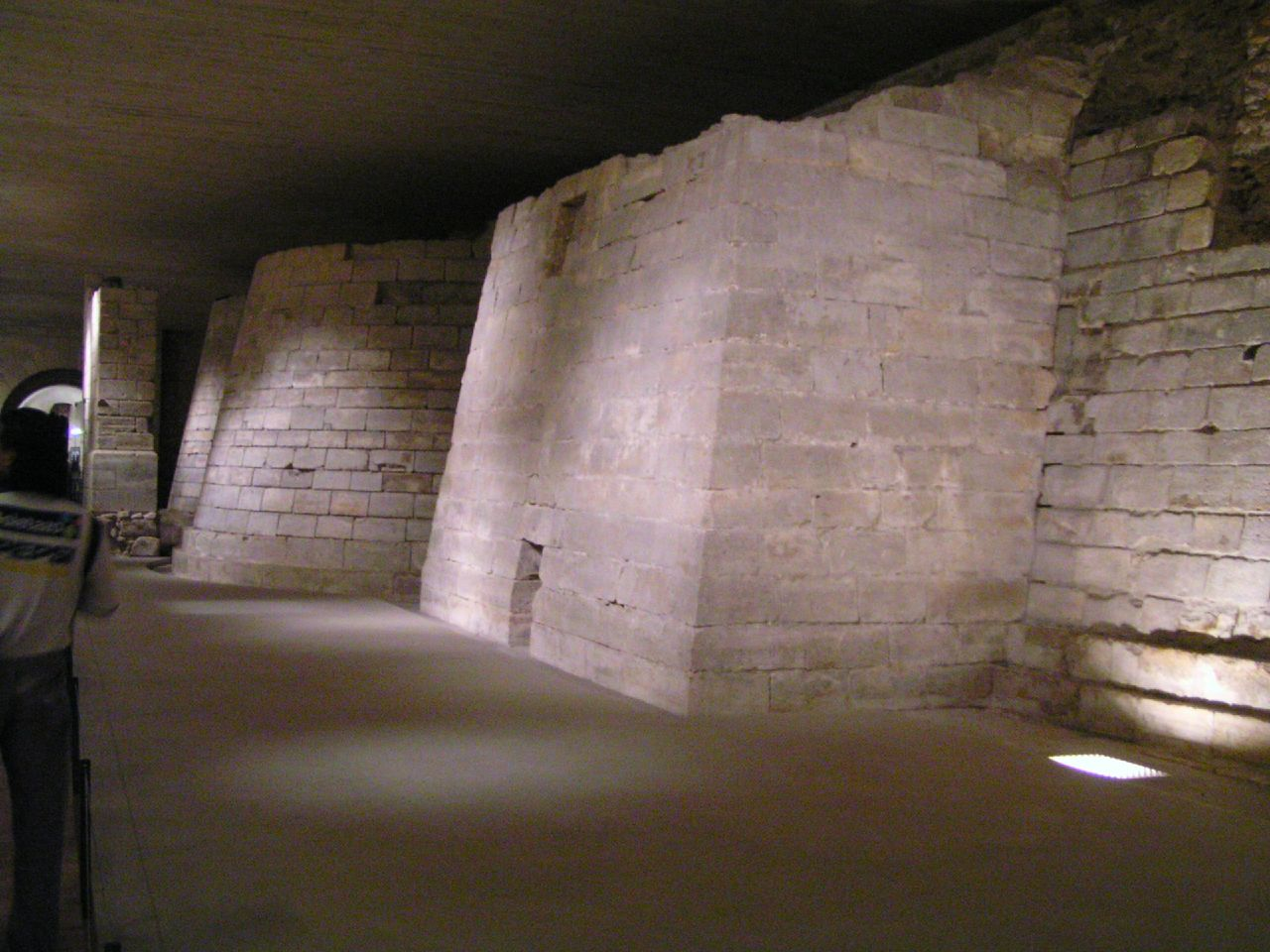
Remains of the Louvre's basement level, restored and opened to the public in the 1980s

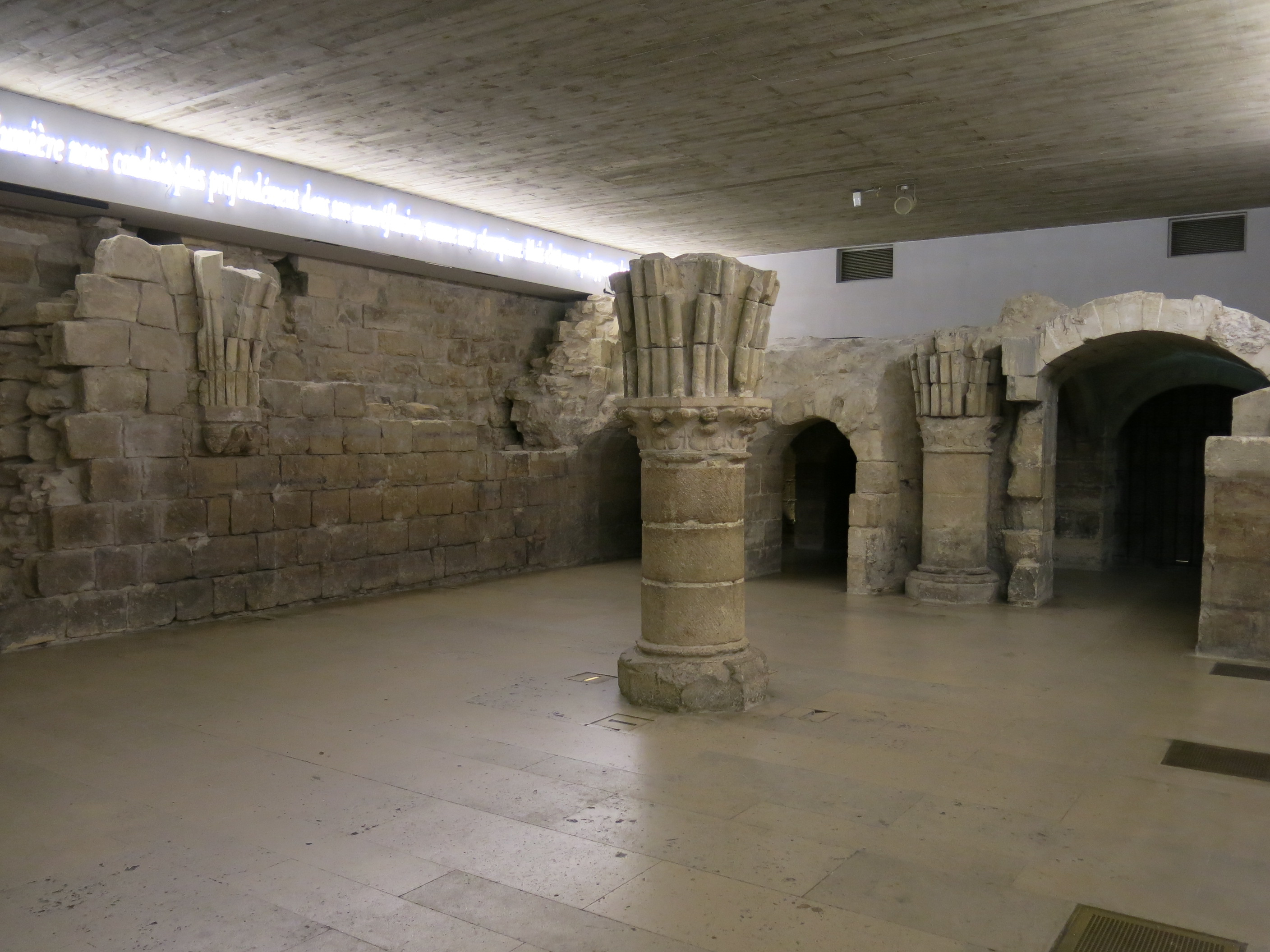
The Salle Saint-Louis following its remodeling in the 1980s

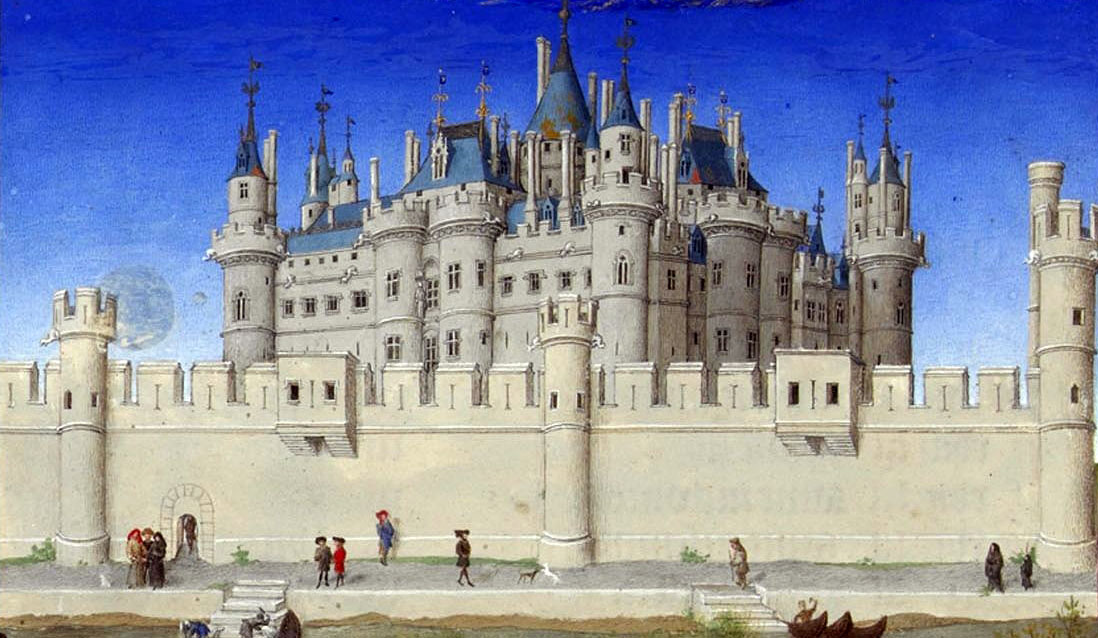
The Louvre pictured in the Très Riches Heures du Duc de Berry, 1410s

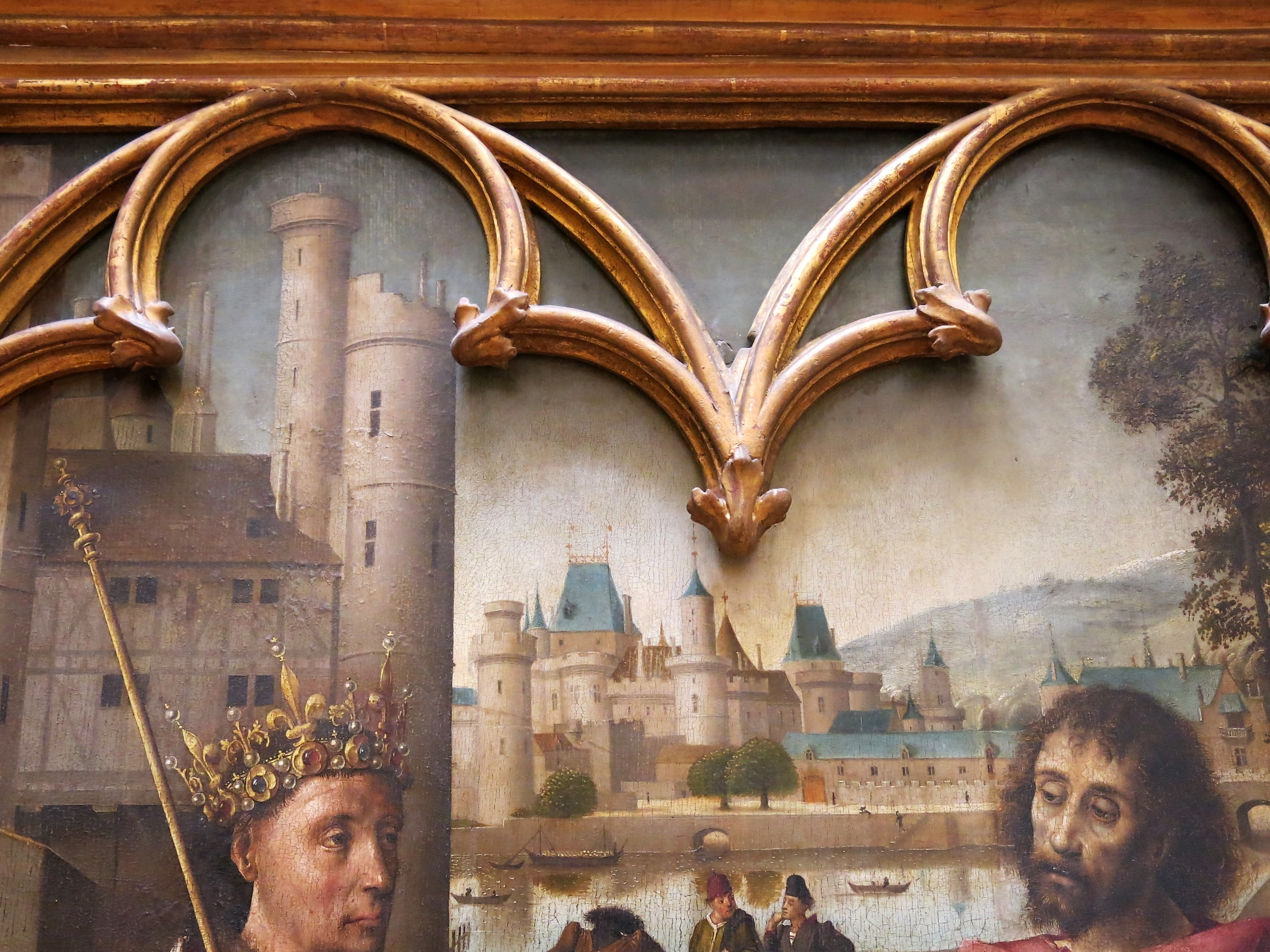
The Louvre pictured in the Altarpiece of the Parlement de Paris, mid-15th century

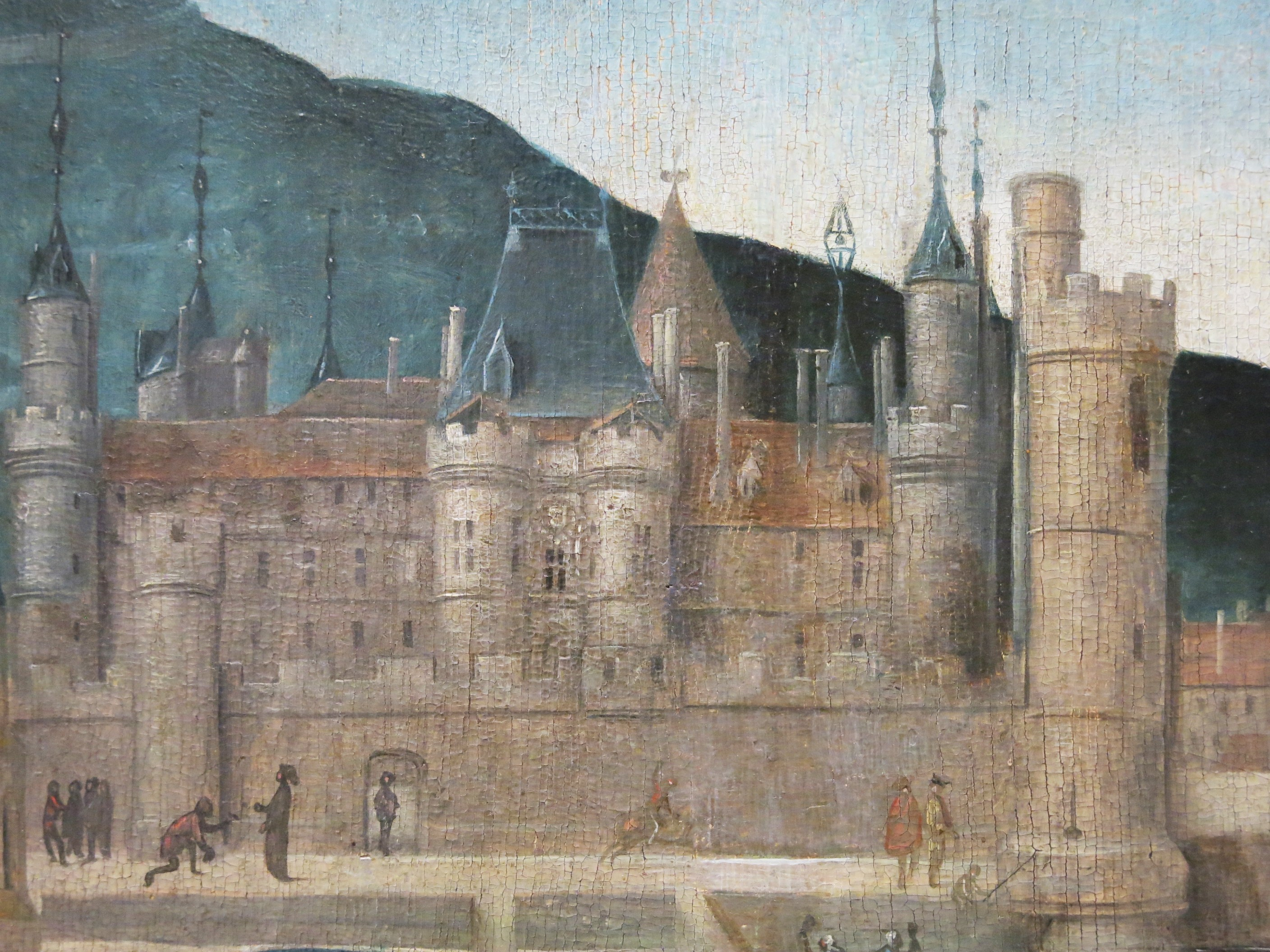
The Louvre seen from the south, pictured in the Pietà of Saint-Germain-des-Prés, late 15th century

=== 16th century ===
In 1528, after returning from his captivity in Spain following his defeat at Pavia, Francis I ordered the demolition of the Louvre's old keep. In 1546 he formally commissioned the architect Pierre Lescot and sculptor Jean Goujon to modernize the Louvre into a Renaissance style palace, but the project appears to have actually started in 1545 since Lescot ordered stone deliveries in December of that year. The death of Francis I in 1547 interrupted the work, but it restarted under Francis's successor Henry II who on 10 July 1549 ordered changes in the building's design.

Lescot tore down the western wing of the old Louvre Castle and rebuilt it as what has become known as the Lescot Wing, ending on the southern side with the Pavillon du Roi. In the latter, he designed in 1556 the ceiling for Henry II's bedroom, still largely preserved after relocation in 1829 to the Louvre's Colonnade Wing, for which he departed from the French tradition of beamed ceilings. On the ground floor, Lescot installed monumental stone caryatids based on classical precedents in the salle des gardes, now known as the Salle des Caryatides. On the northern end of the new wing, Lescot created a monumental staircase in the 1550s, long known as the Grand Degré du Roi (now Escalier Henri II, with sculpted ceilings attributed to Jean Goujon.

During the early 1560s, Lescot demolished the southern wing of the old Louvre and started to replace it with a duplication of the Lescot Wing. His plan may have been to create a square complex of a similar size as the old Louvre, not dissimilar to the Château d'Écouen that had been recently completed on Jean Bullant's design, with an identical third wing to the north and a lower, entrance wing on the eastern side. A contested hypothesis attributes to Lescot the first intent to extend the Louvre's courtyard to its current size by doubling the lengths of the wings, even though no implementation was made of such plans until the 1620s.

Lescot is also credited with the design of the Petite Galerie, which ran from the southwest corner of the Louvre to the Seine. All work stopped in the late 1560s, however, as the Wars of Religion gathered momentum.

In the meantime, beginning in 1564, Catherine de' Medici directed the building of a new residence to the west, outside the wall of Charles V. It became known as the Tuileries Palace because it was built on the site of old tile factories (tuileries). Architect Philibert de l'Orme started the project, and was replaced after his death in 1570 by Jean Bullant. A letter of March 1565 indicates that Catherine de' Medici already considered a building to connect the Tuileries with the older Louvre building.

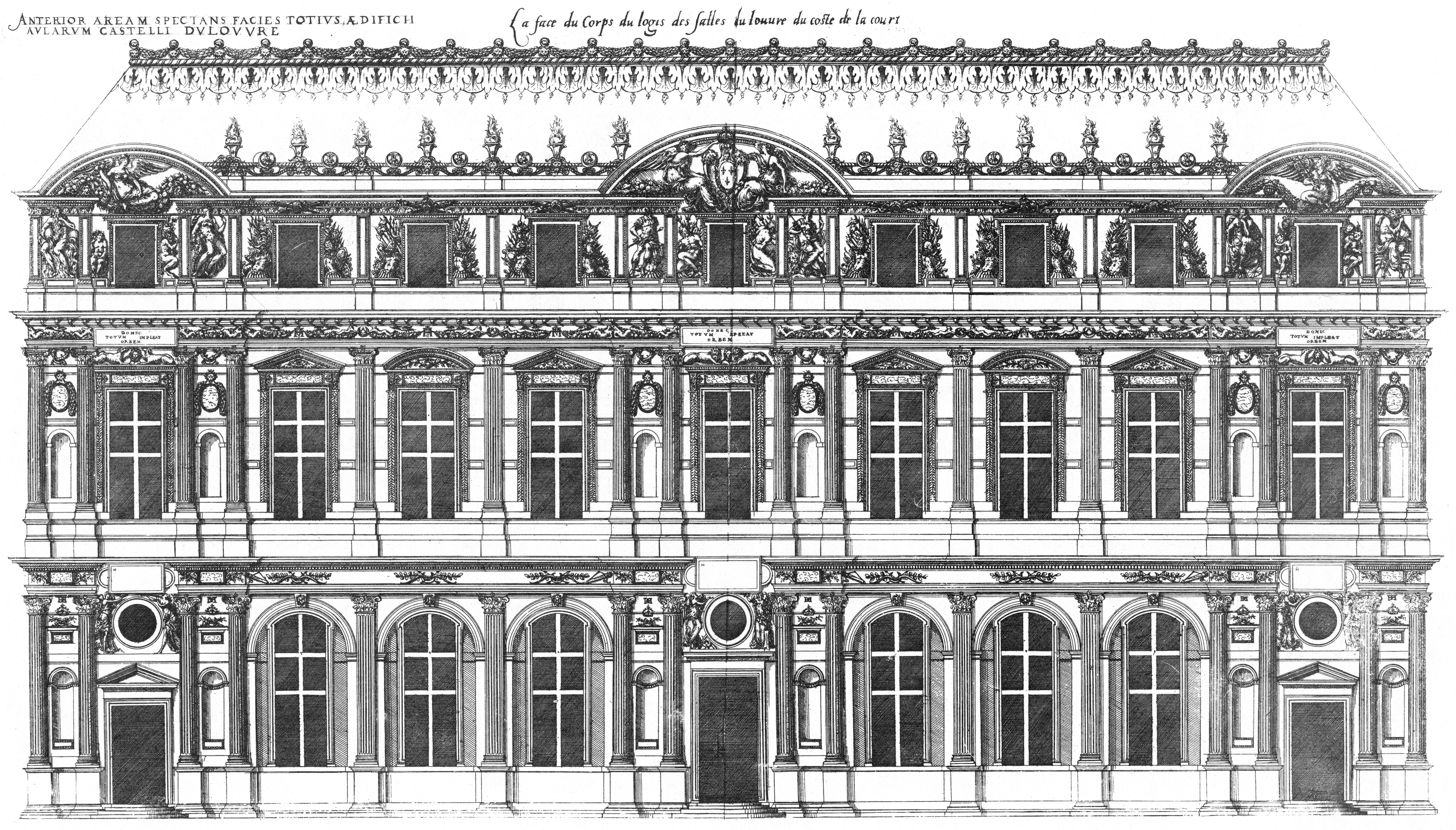
Court façade of the Lescot Wing, engraved by Jacques Androuet du Cerceau, 1576

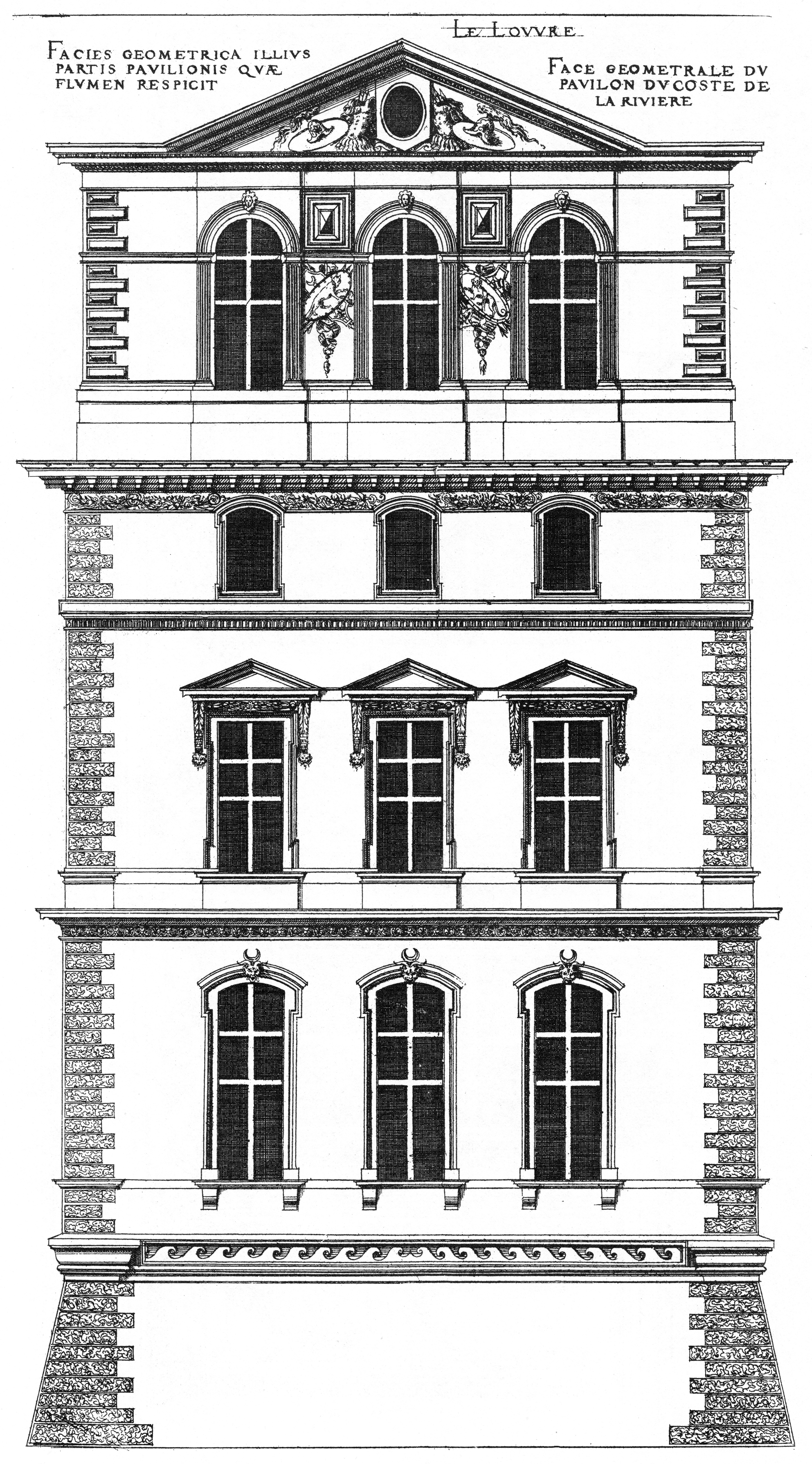
Pavillon du Roi, south façade, du Cerceau, 1576

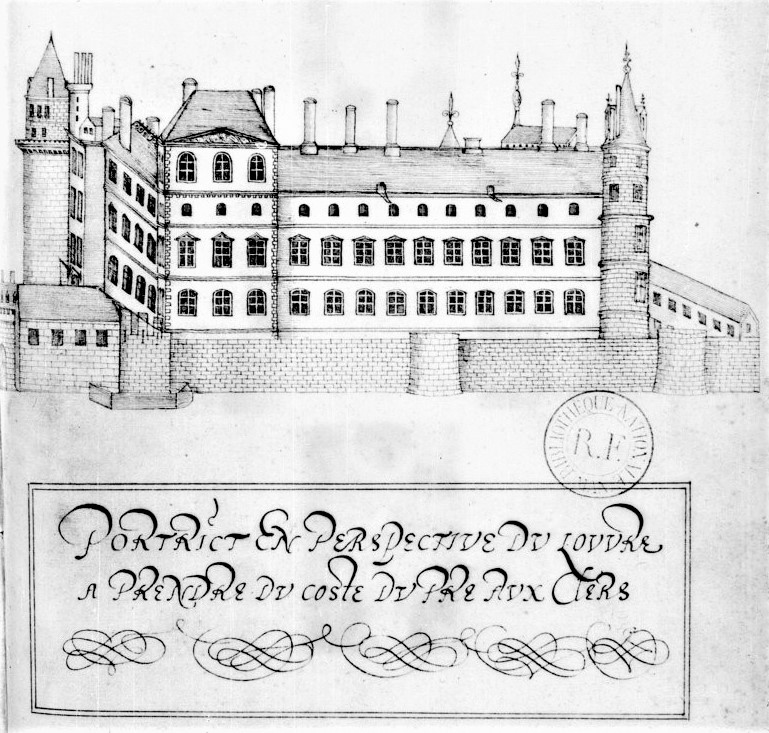
The Louvre in an ink drawing by Jacques Cellier, 1580s

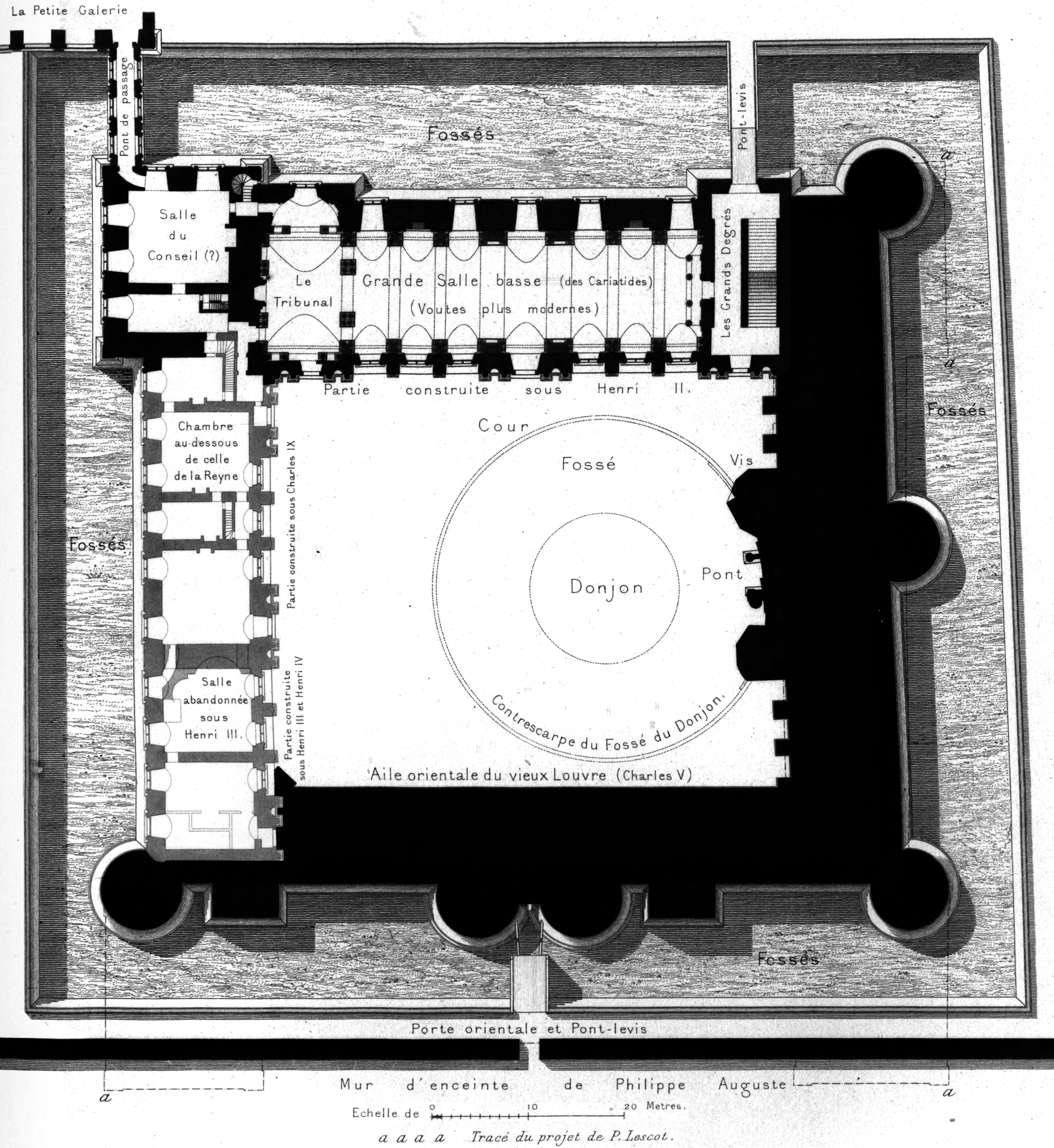
Ground-floor plan of the Renaissance Louvre with the Lescot Wing at the top and the south wing on the left

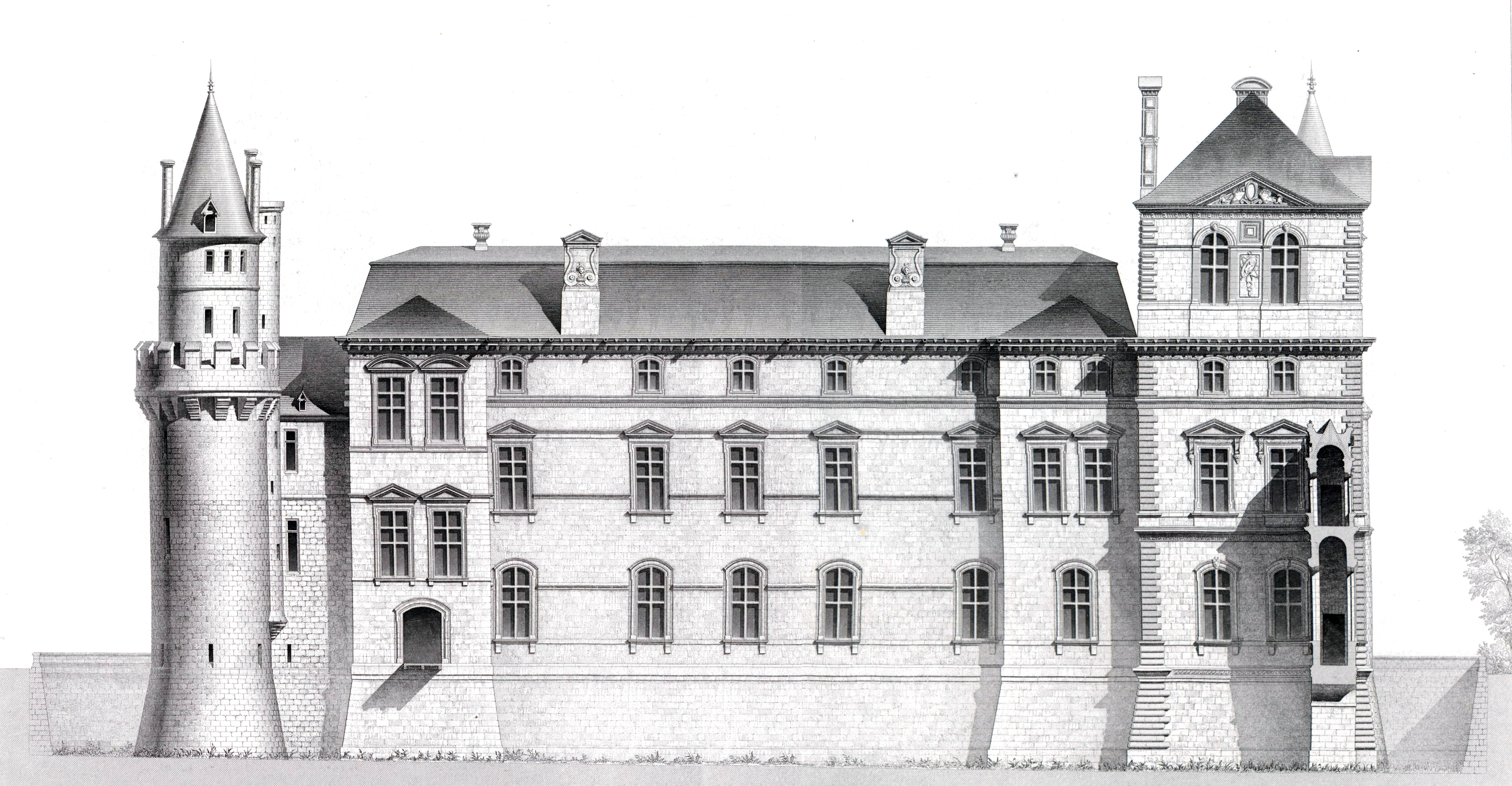
West façade of the Lescot Wing c. 1560, elevation drawing by architect Henri Legrand (1868) based on historical documents

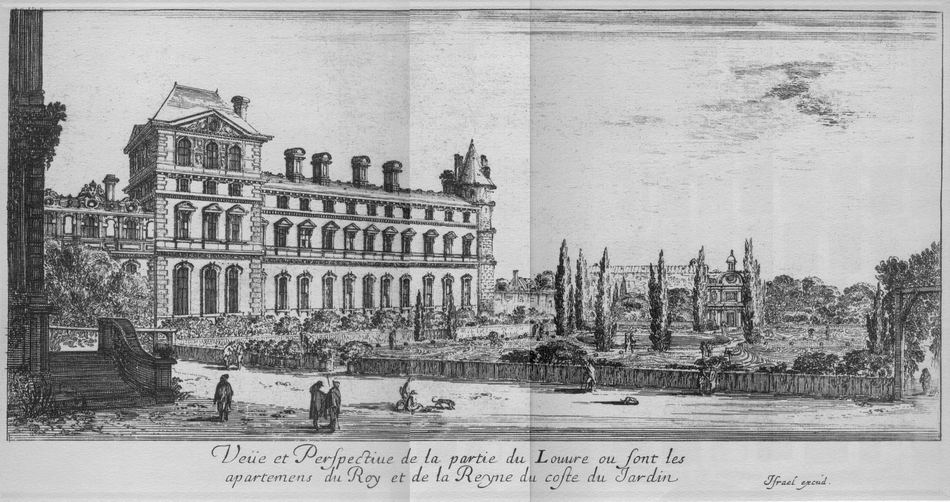
South façade with the Pavillon du Roi on the left and the southeast tower of the old Louvre on the right (engraved by Israël Silvestre, c. 1650)

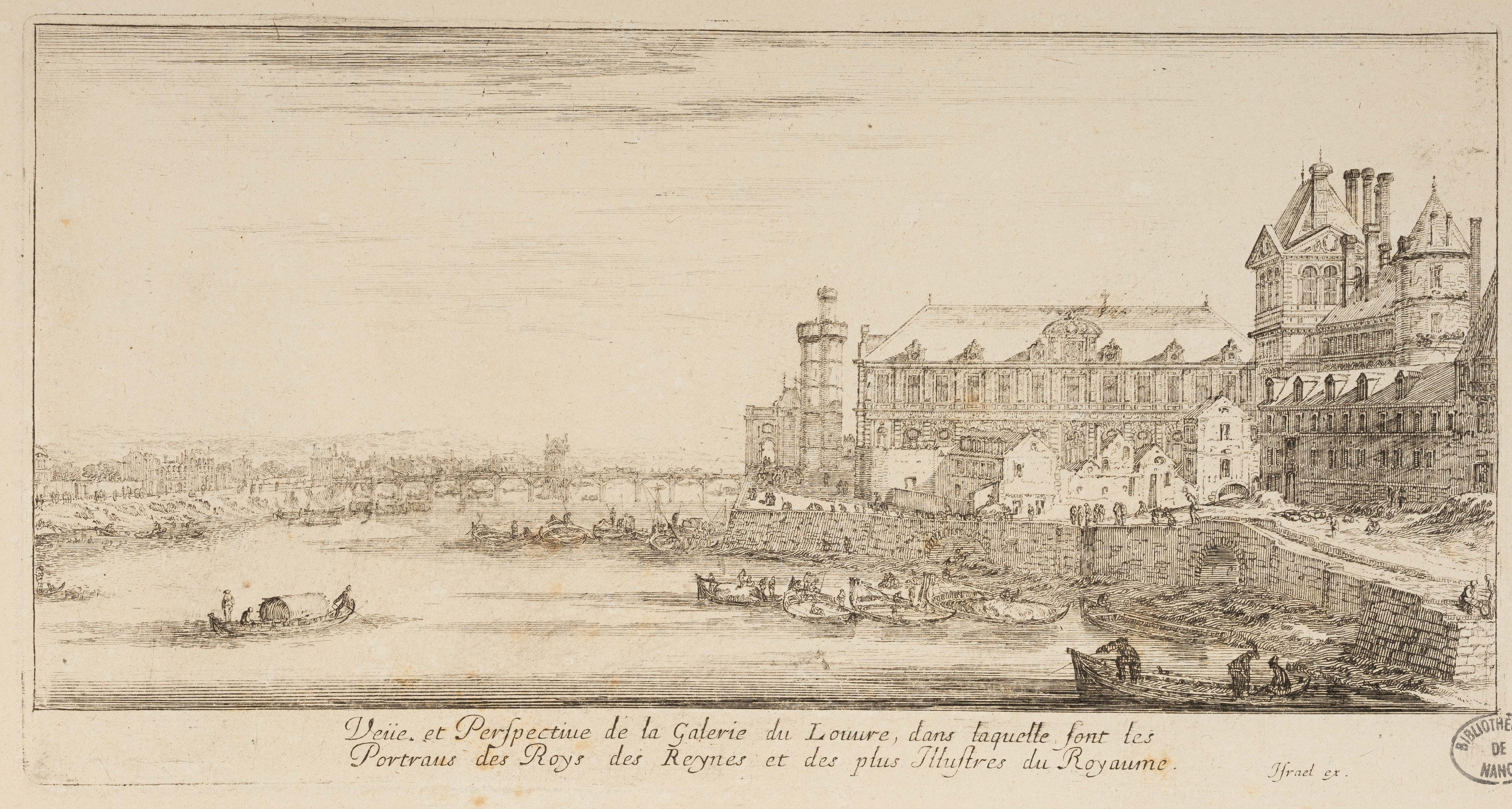
View of the Petite Galerie with the south wing on the right (engraved by Silvestre before 1654)

Henry IV, France's new king from 1589 (the first from the House of Bourbon) and master of Paris from 1594, is associated with the further articulation of what became known as the Grand Dessein ("Grand Design") of uniting the Louvre and the Tuileries in a single building, together with the extension of the eastern courtyard to the current dimensions of the Cour Carrée. From early 1595 he directed the construction of the Grande Galerie, designed by his competing architects Louis Métezeau and Jacques II Androuet du Cerceau, who are respectively credited with the eastern and western sections of the building by a long tradition of scholarship. This major addition, about 460 meters long, was built along the bank of the Seine. On the ground floor at the eastern end of the new wing, Métezeau created a lavishly decorated room that was known as the Salle des Ambassadeurs or Salle des Antiques, later called Salle d'Auguste and now Salle des Empereurs. At the time, the room on the first floor above, later Salon Carré, was known as Grand Salon or Salon du Louvre. Henry IV also had the first floor of the Petite Galerie built up and decorated as the Salle des Peintures, with portraits of the former kings and queens of France. A portrait of Marie de' Medici by Frans Pourbus the Younger, still in the Louvre, is a rare remnant of this series.

=== 17th century ===
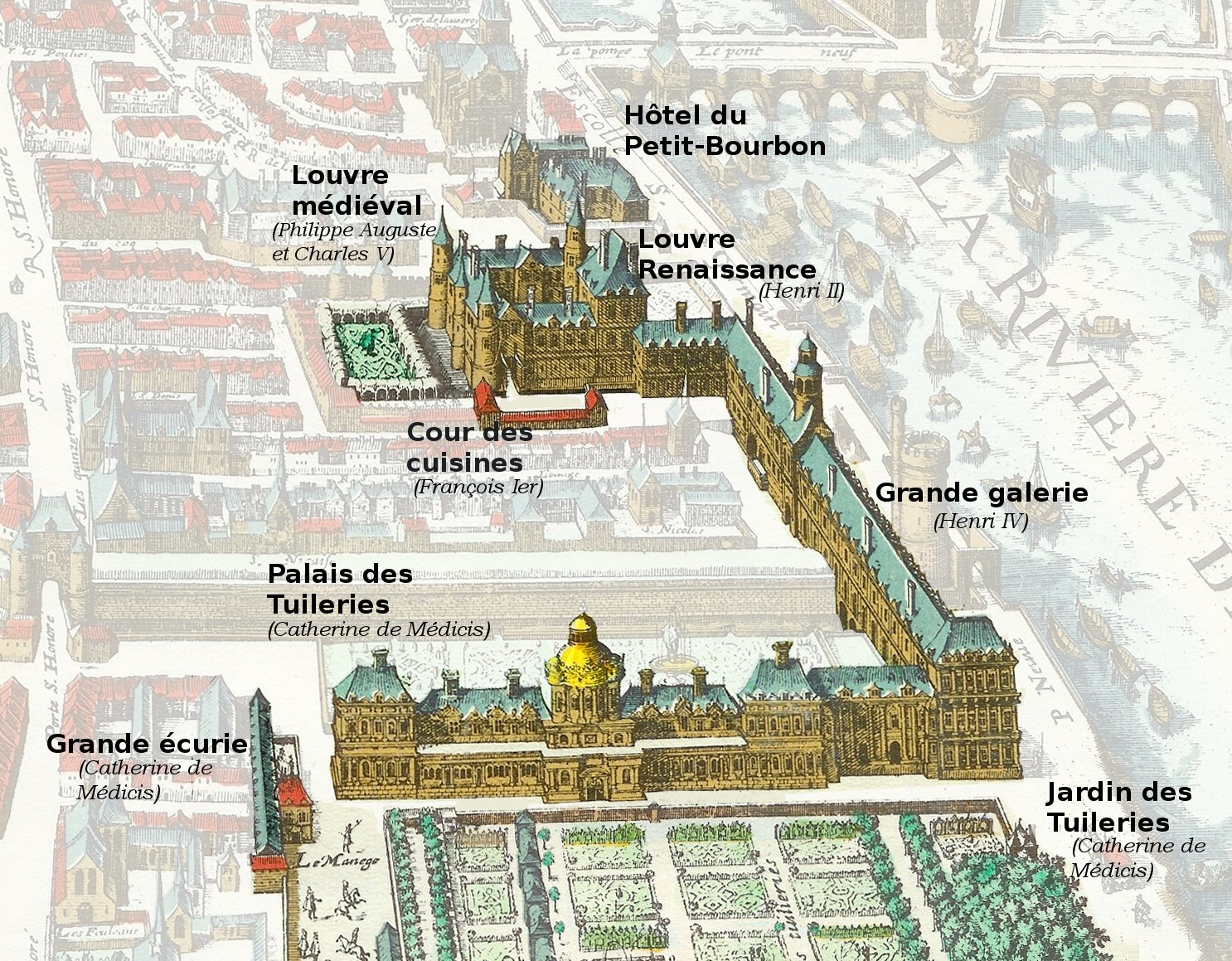
The Tuileries Palace connected by the Grande Galerie to the Renaissance Louvre on Merian map of Paris, 1615

In 1624, Louis XIII initiated the construction on a new building echoing the Pavillon du Roi on the northern end of the Lescot Wing, now known as the Pavillon de l'Horloge, and of a wing further north that would start the quadrupling of the Louvre's courtyard. Architect Jacques Lemercier won the design competition against Jean Androuet du Cerceau, Clément II Métezeau, and the son of Salomon de Brosse. The works were stopped in 1628 at a time of hardship for the kingdom and state finances, and only progressed very slowly if at all until 1639. In 1639 Lemercier started a new building campaign during which the Pavillon de l'Horloge was completed. Its second staircase, mirroring Lescot's Grand Degré to the north, was still unfinished when the Fronde again interrupted the works in the 1640s, and its decoration has never been completed since then. At that time, much of the construction (though not the decoration) of the new wing had been completed, but the northern pavilion, or Pavillon de Beauvais, designed by Lemercier similarly as Lescot's Pavillon du Roi, had barely been started.

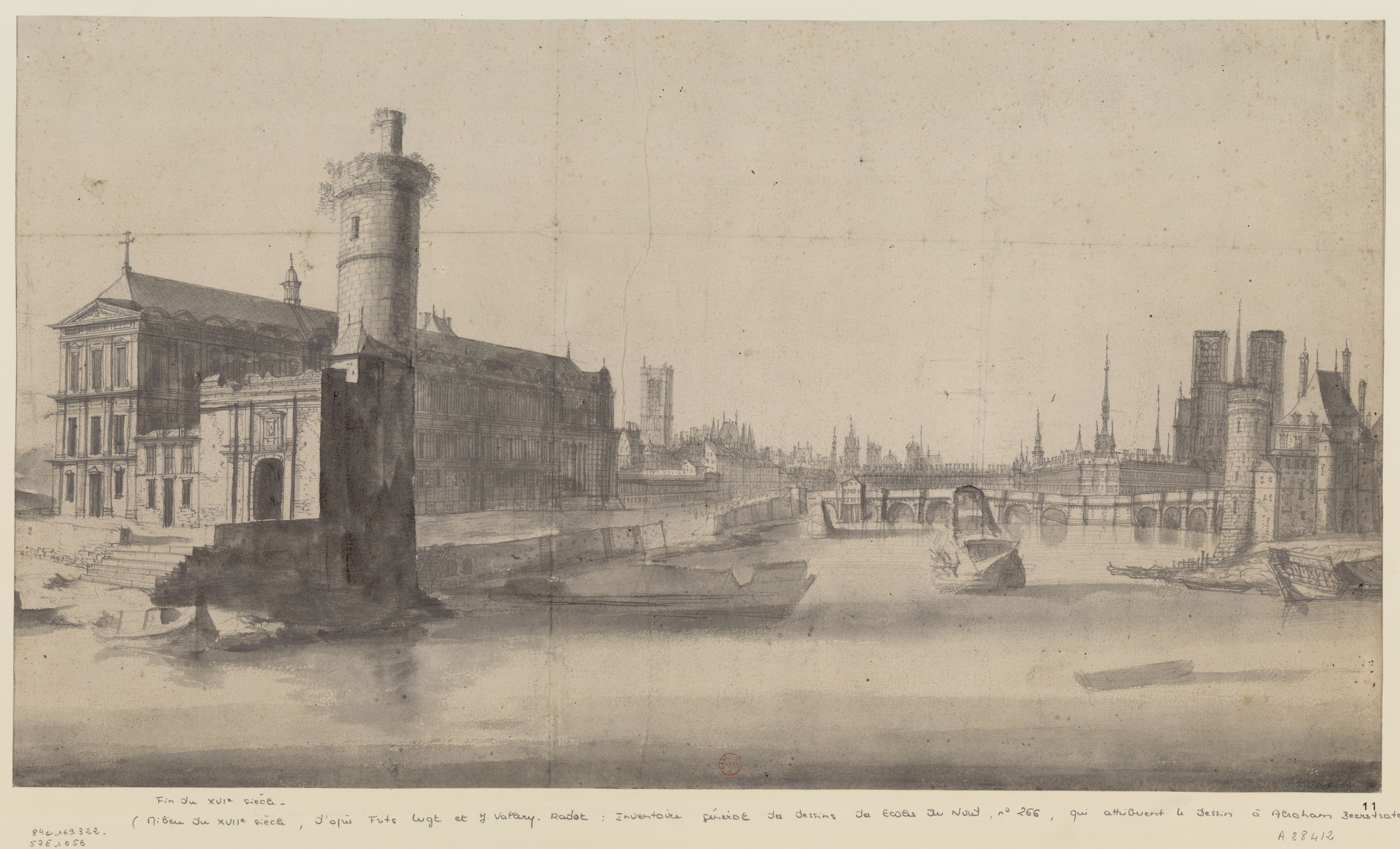
The unfinished Grande Galerie and the Tour du Bois (end tower of the Wall of Charles V) in the early 1600s

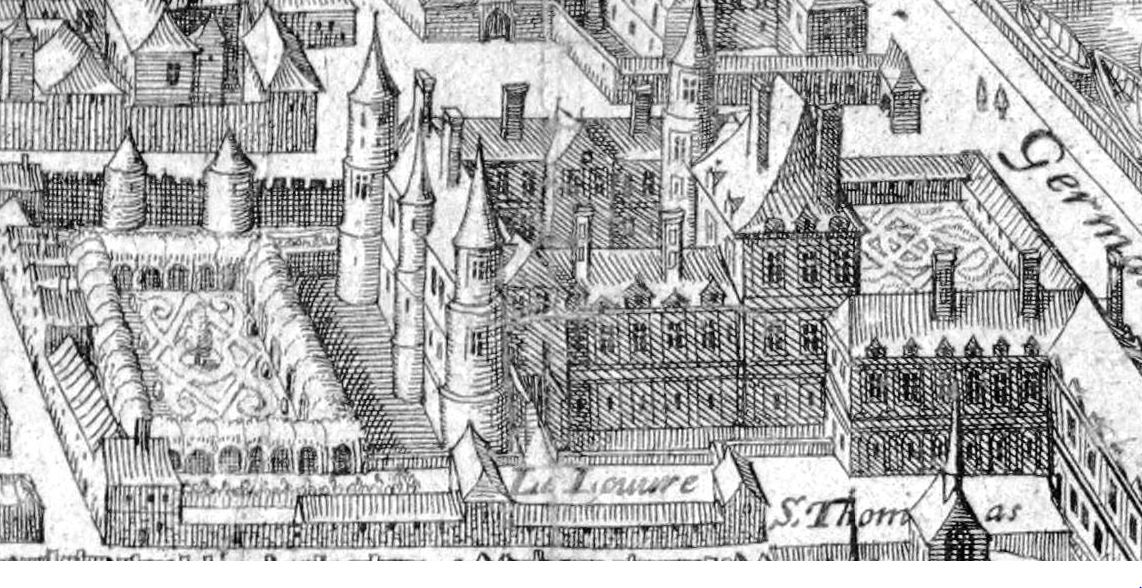
The Pavillon du Roi and Lescot Wing with the rest of the medieval castle still standing, Merian map of Paris (1615)

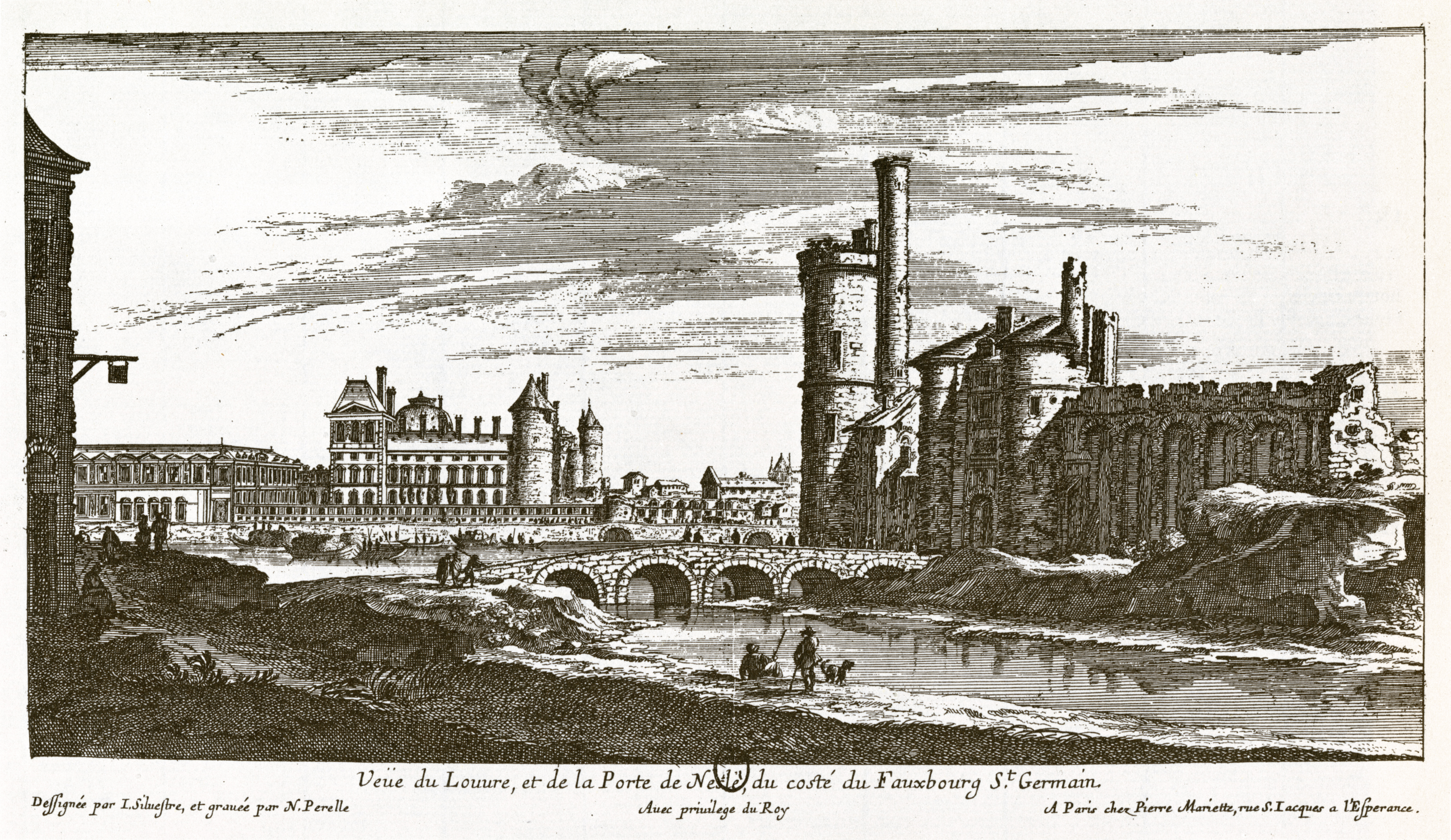
View of the Louvre from the Left Bank, with the Pavillon du Roi and Pavillon de l'Horloge (left) and the medieval Louvre's towers still standing (right), by Israël Silvestre

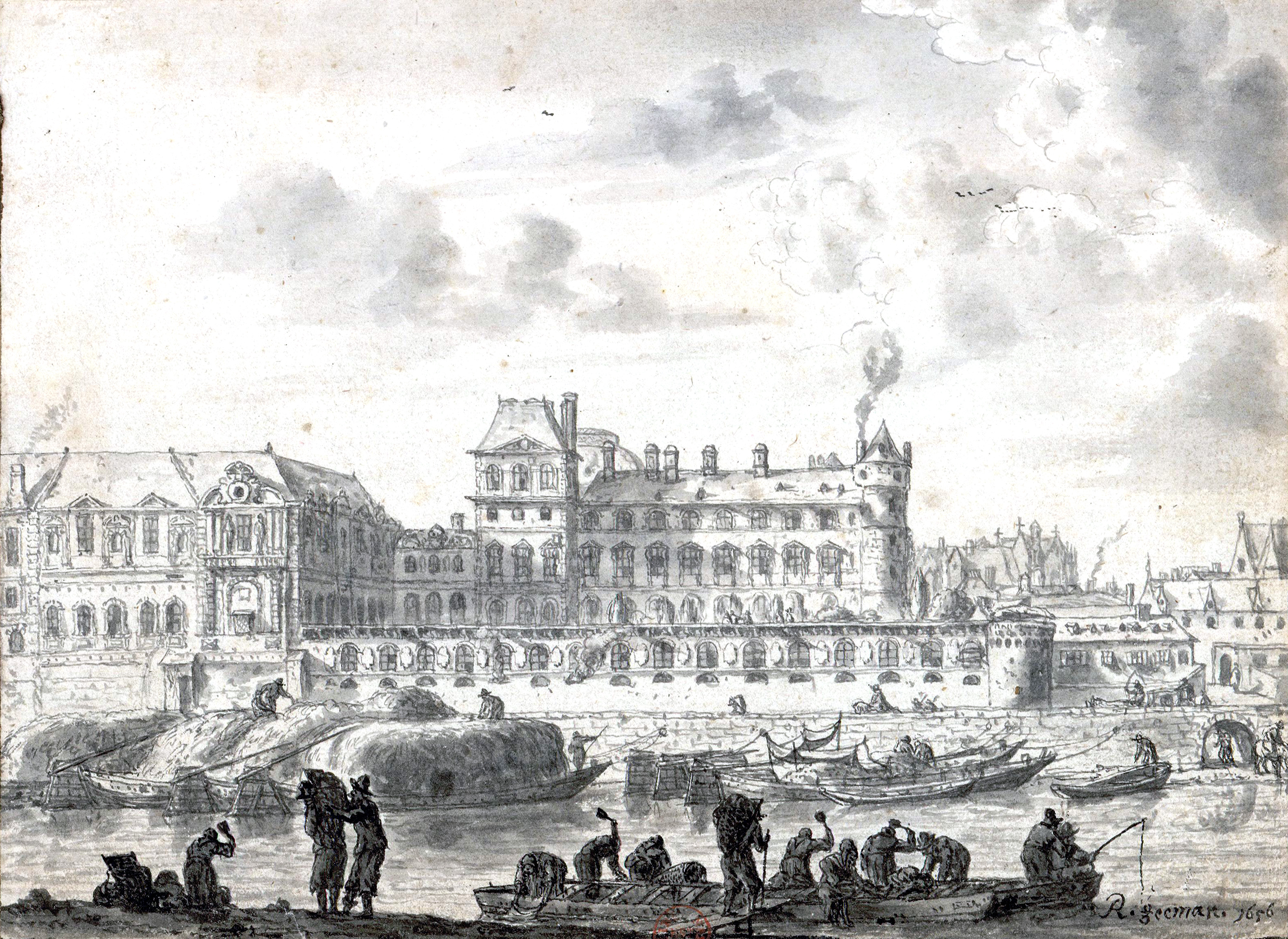
Similar view in 1656, by Reinier Nooms

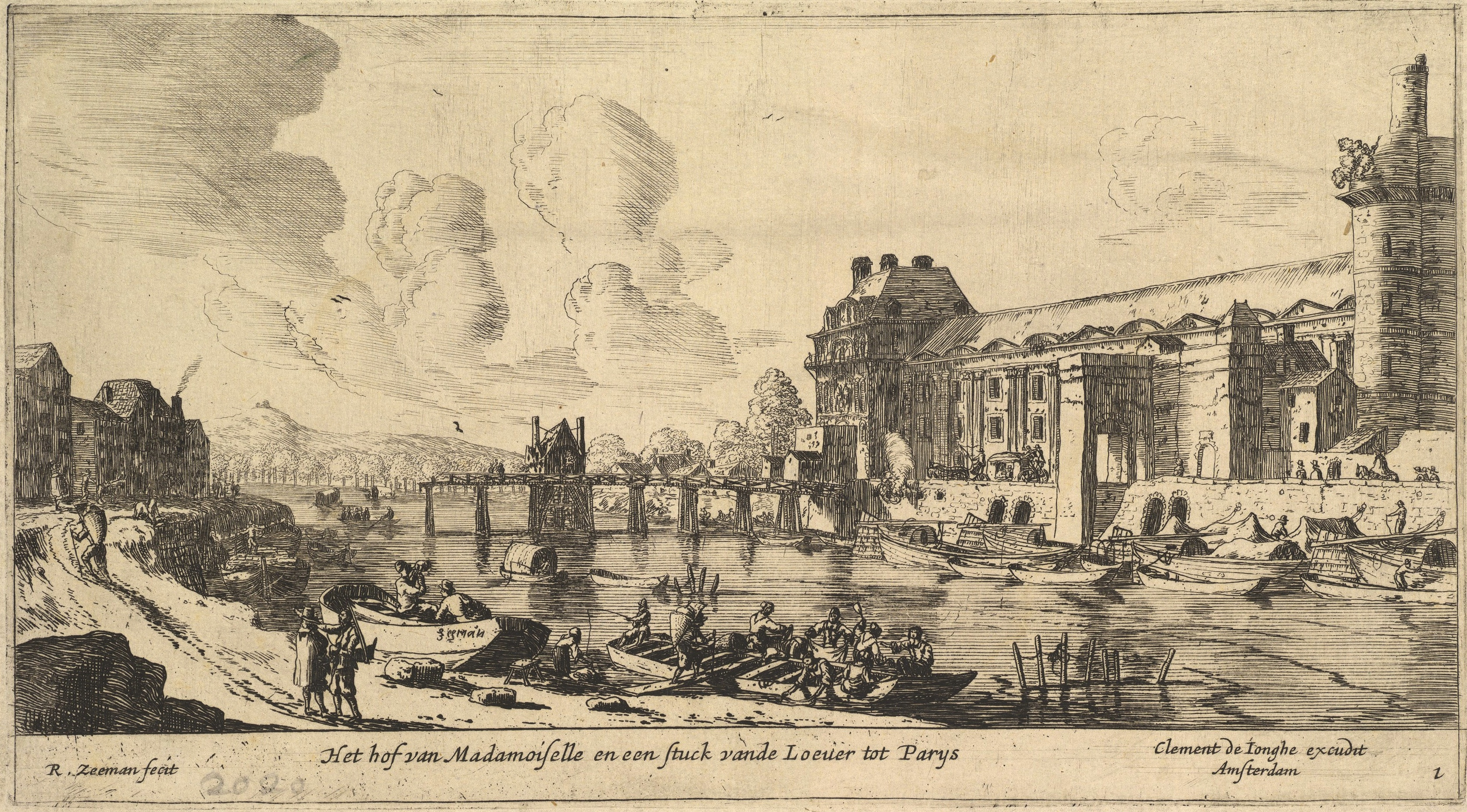
The Pont Rouge (now Pont Royal), Pavillon de Flore and western section of the Grande Galerie with the Tour du Bois still standing in the mid-17th century, by Reinier Nooms

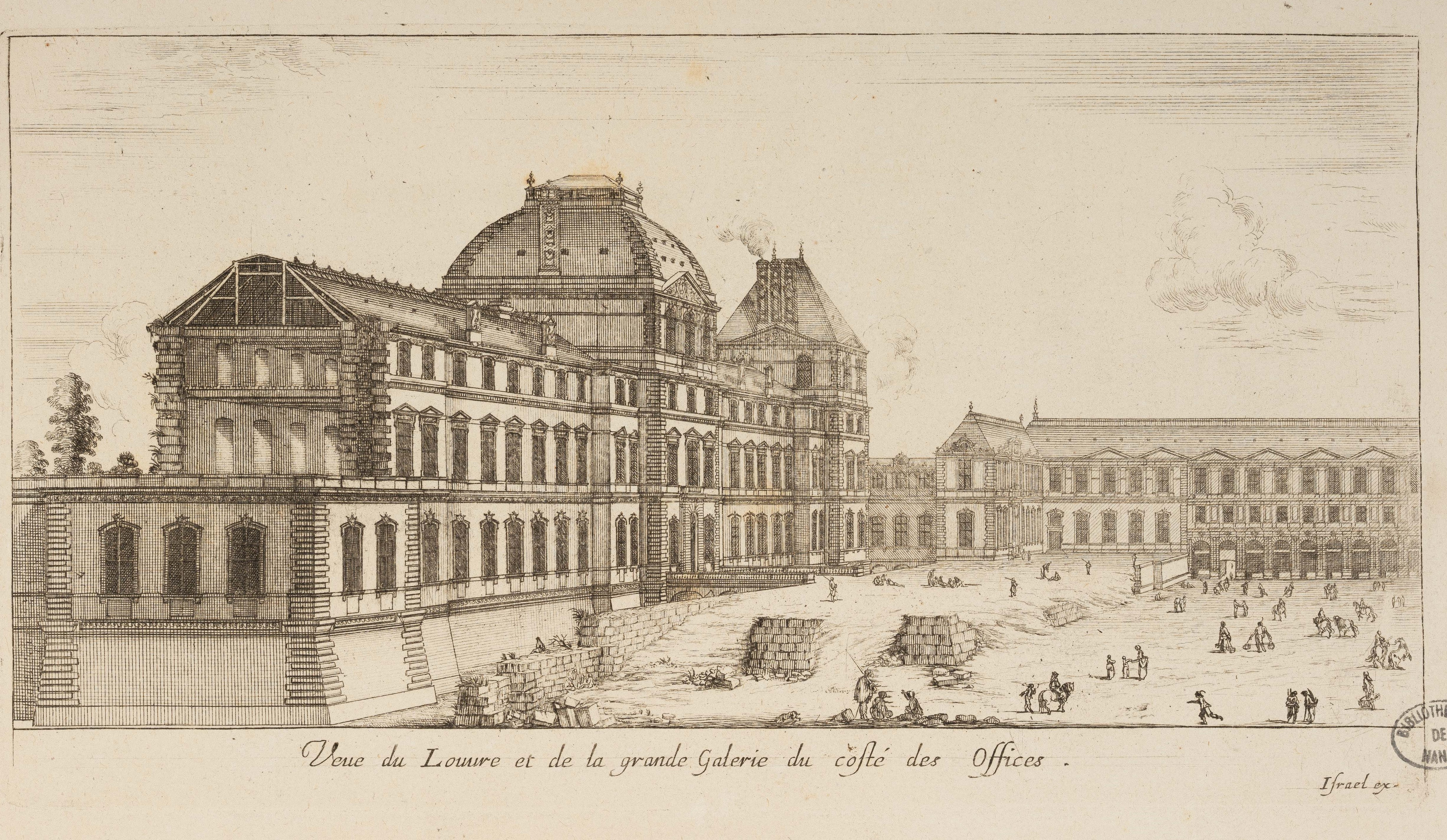
West façade of the Louvre with Jacques Lemercier's northward extension and the ground-floor walls of Pavillon de Beauvais in the foreground; engraving c.1644 by Israël Silvestre

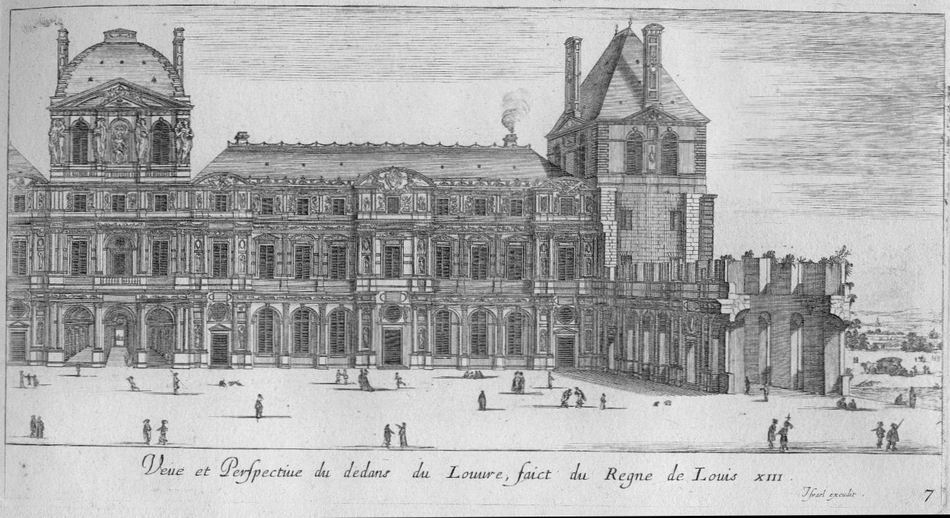
Lemercier's wing pictured at a later date with the Pavillon de Beauvais completed and the start of the north wing heading east, engraving by Israël Silvestre

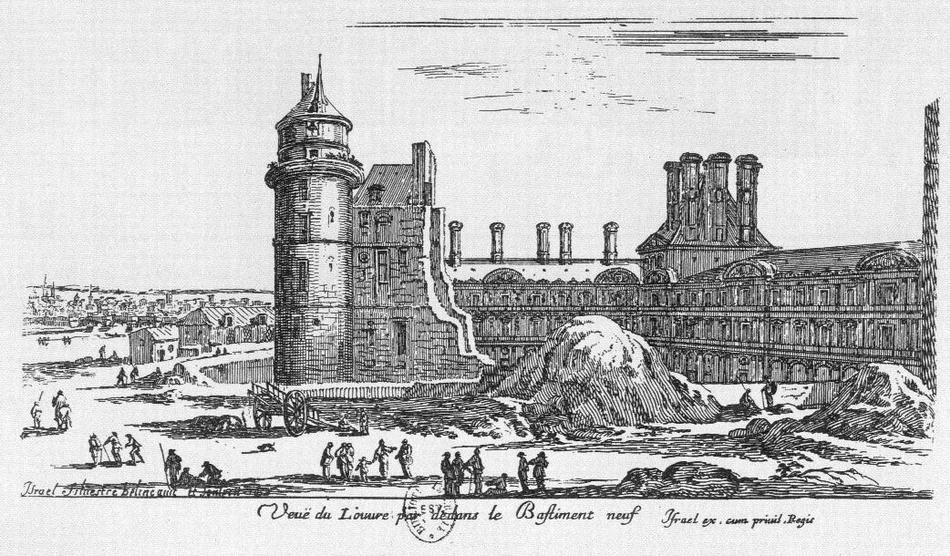
Demolition of the north wing of the old Louvre Castle with the northeast tower still intact, engraving by Israël Silvestre

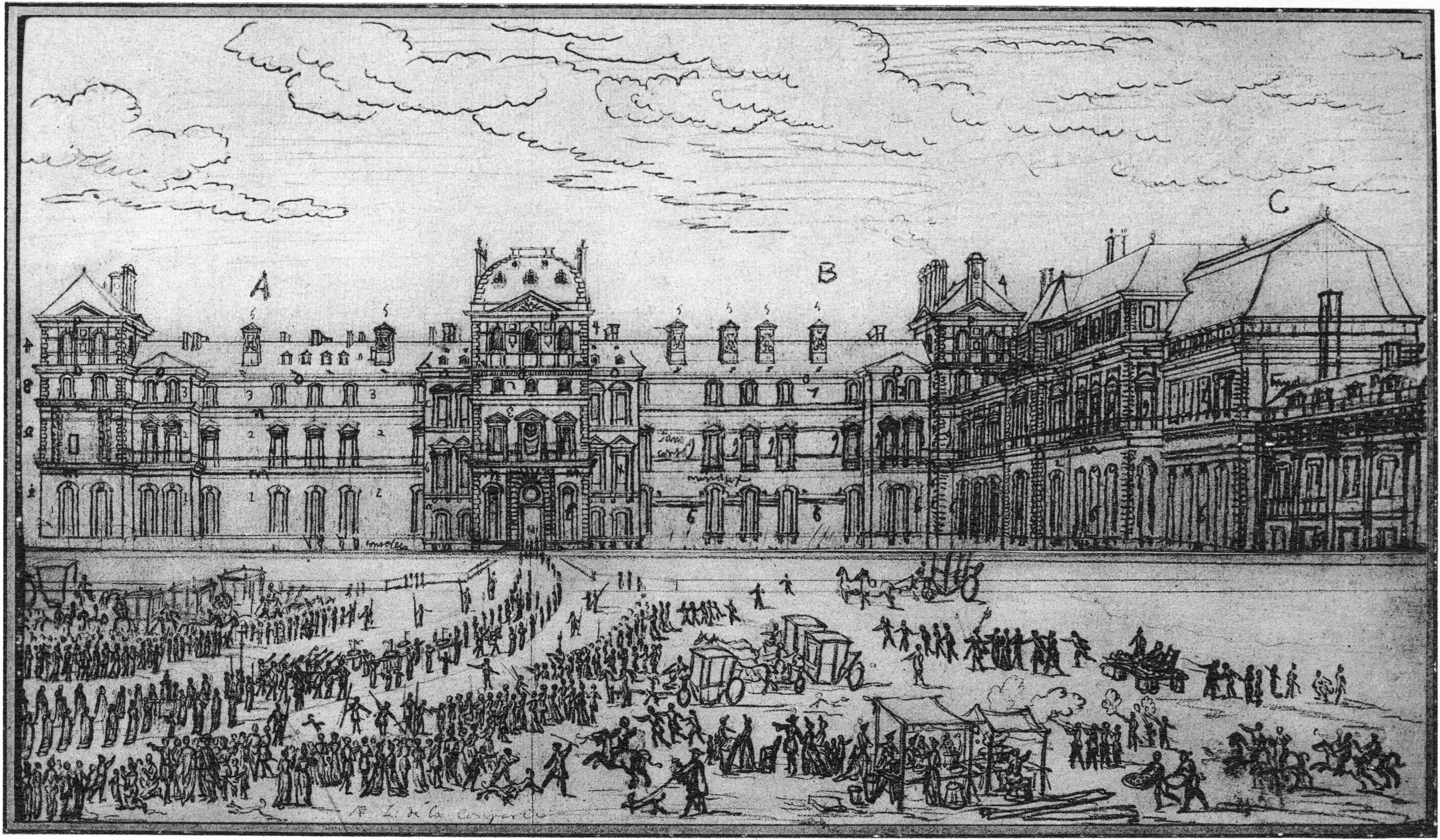
The Louvre's western façade facing the Tuileries, after Le Vau's 1660s reconstruction of the Petite Galerie, by Israël Silvestre

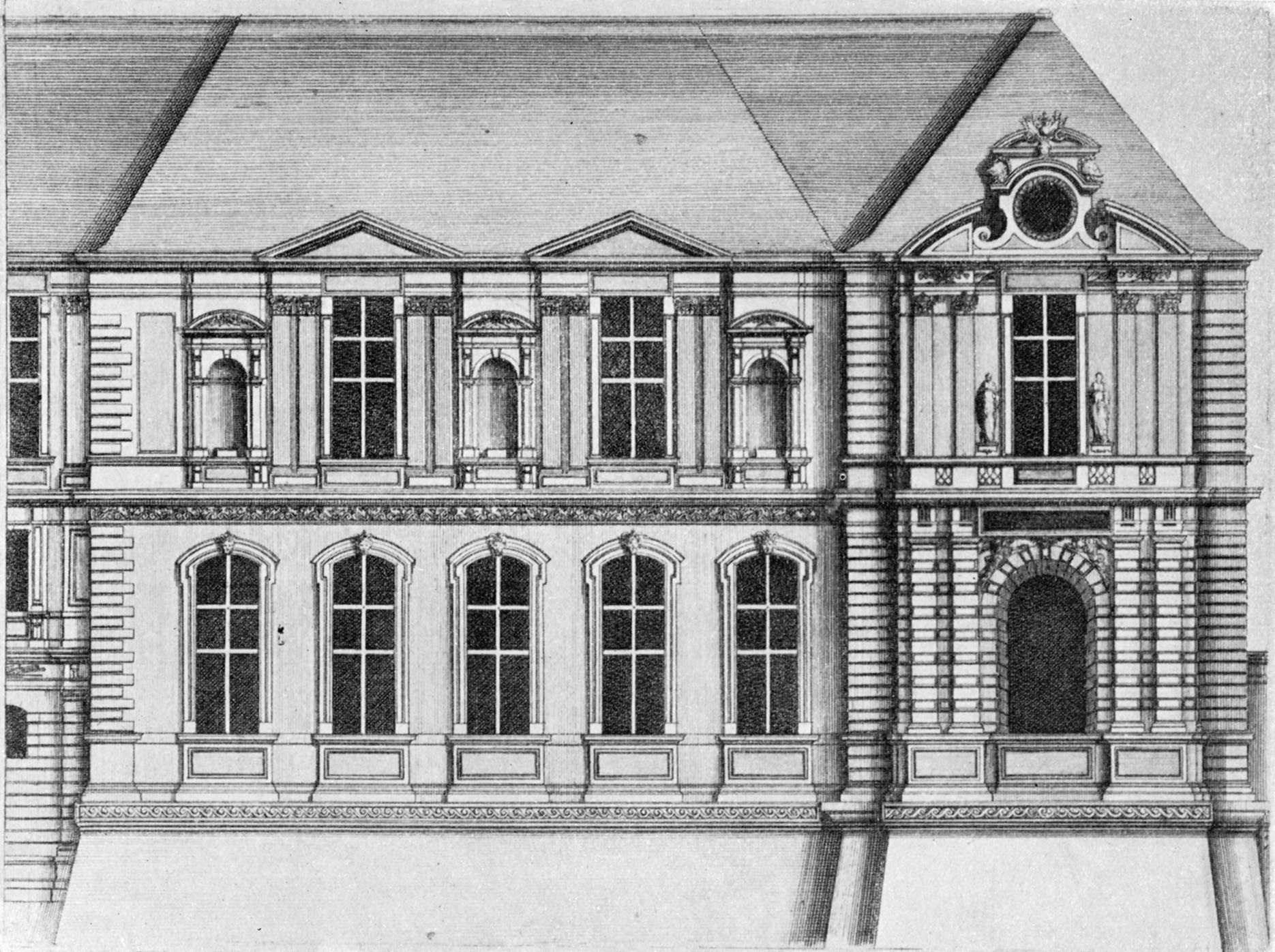
View of the Salon Carré and the southern end of the Petite Galerie from the south, engraving c.1670 by Jean Marot

On the southern side, Lemercier commissioned Nicolas Poussin to decorate the ceiling of the Grande Galerie. Poussin arrived from Rome in early 1641, but returned to Italy in November 1642 leaving the work unfinished. During Louis XIV's minority and the Fronde, from 1643 to 1652 the Louvre was left empty as the royal family stayed at the Palais-Royal or outside of Paris; the Grande Galerie served as a wheat warehouse and deteriorated.

On 21 October 1652, the king and the court ceremonially re-entered the Louvre and made it their residence again, initiating a new burst of construction that would last to the late 1670s.

Meanwhile Anne of Austria, like Marie de' Medici as queen mother before her, inhabited the ground-floor apartment in the Cour Carrée's southern wing. She extended it to the ground floor of the Petite Galerie, which had previously been the venue for the King's Council That "summer apartment" was fitted by architect Louis Le Vau, who had succeeded Lemercier upon the latter's death in 1654. The ceilings, decorated in 1655–1658 by Giovanni Francesco Romanelli who had been recommended by Cardinal Mazarin, are still extant in the suite of rooms now known as the Appartement d'été d'Anne d'Autriche.

In 1659, Louis XIV instigated a new phase of construction under Le Vau and painter Charles Le Brun. Le Vau oversaw the remodeling and completion of the Tuileries Palace, and at the Louvre, the completion of the walls of the north wing and of the eastern half of the south wing. By 1660 the Pavillon de Beauvais and the western half of the northern wing had been completed; in October of that year, most of the Hôtel du Petit-Bourbon was demolished to make way for the completion of the Cour Carrée. On the courtyard's southern side the Pavillon des Arts was completed in 1663, with a design by Le Vau that echoed that of the Pavillon de l'Horloge. Most of the northern wing was completed in the mid-1660s, though without a salient central pavilion as had been built on the west and south (Pavillon de l'Horloge, Pavillon des Arts) or on the southwestern and northwestern corners (Pavillon du Roi, Pavillon de Beauvais).

On 6 February 1661, a fire destroyed the attic of the Grand Salon and much of the Salle des Peintures in the Petite Galerie (though not Anne of Austria's ground-floor apartment). Le Vau was tasked by Louis XIV to lead the reconstruction. He rebuilt the Petite Galerie as the more ornate Galerie d'Apollon, created a new suite of rooms flanking it to the west (the Grand Cabinet du Roi, later Escalier Percier et Fontaine) with a new façade on what became known as the Cour de la Reine (later Cour de l'Infante, Cour du Musée, and now Cour du Sphinx), and expanded the former Grand Salon on the northern side as well as making it double-height, creating the Salon Carré in its current dimensions. From 1668 to 1678 the Grande Galerie was also decorated with wood panelling, even though that work was left unfinished. The Salon Carré, however, was still undecorated when the court left for Versailles in the late 1670s. Meanwhile, landscape architect André Le Nôtre redesigned the Tuileries, first created in 1564 in the Italian style, as a French formal garden.

The other major project of the 1660s was to create the Louvre's façade towards the city and thus complete the Cour Carrée on its eastern side. It involved a convoluted process, with the king's minister Jean-Baptiste Colbert first sidelining Le Vau and then summoning Gian Lorenzo Bernini from Italy. Bernini stayed in Paris from 2 June to 20 October 1665, but none of his five striking designs gained approval, even though some building works started on their basis. Eventually a committee comprising Le Vau, Charles Le Brun and Claude Perrault produced a symmetrical and classical design featuring a giant Corinthian order colonnade with paired columns and a balustrade running along the flat line of the roof. Works started in 1667 and the exterior structures were largely completed by 1674, but would not be fully decorated and roofed until the early 19th century under Napoleon. The definitive design of the east façade is attributed to Perrault, who made the final alterations needed to accommodate a decision to double the width of the south wing. He designed the new south façade, making it more compatible with the east facade and covering Le Vau's original south facade. Perrault redesigned the north wing's city-side facade, and is thought to have been at least partly responsible for an important alteration to the design of the north, east, and south facades facing the courtyard of the Cour Carrée: the addition of a full third story with pilasters surmounted by a balustrade, very unlike Lescot's attic story to the west. This change was not completed until the first decade of the 19th century (see below).

The works at the Louvre stopped in the late 1670s as the king redirected all construction budgets at the Palace of Versailles, despite his minister Colbert's insistence on completing the Louvre. Louis XIV had already left the Louvre from the beginning of 1666, immediately after the death of his mother Anne of Austria in her ground-floor apartment, and would never reside there again, preferring Versailles, Vincennes, Saint-Germain-en-Laye, or if he had to be in Paris, the Tuileries. From the 1680s a new era started for the Louvre, with comparatively little external construction and fragmentation of its interior spaces across a variety of different uses.

Claude Perrault's design for the north façade, engraved by Jacques-François Blondel

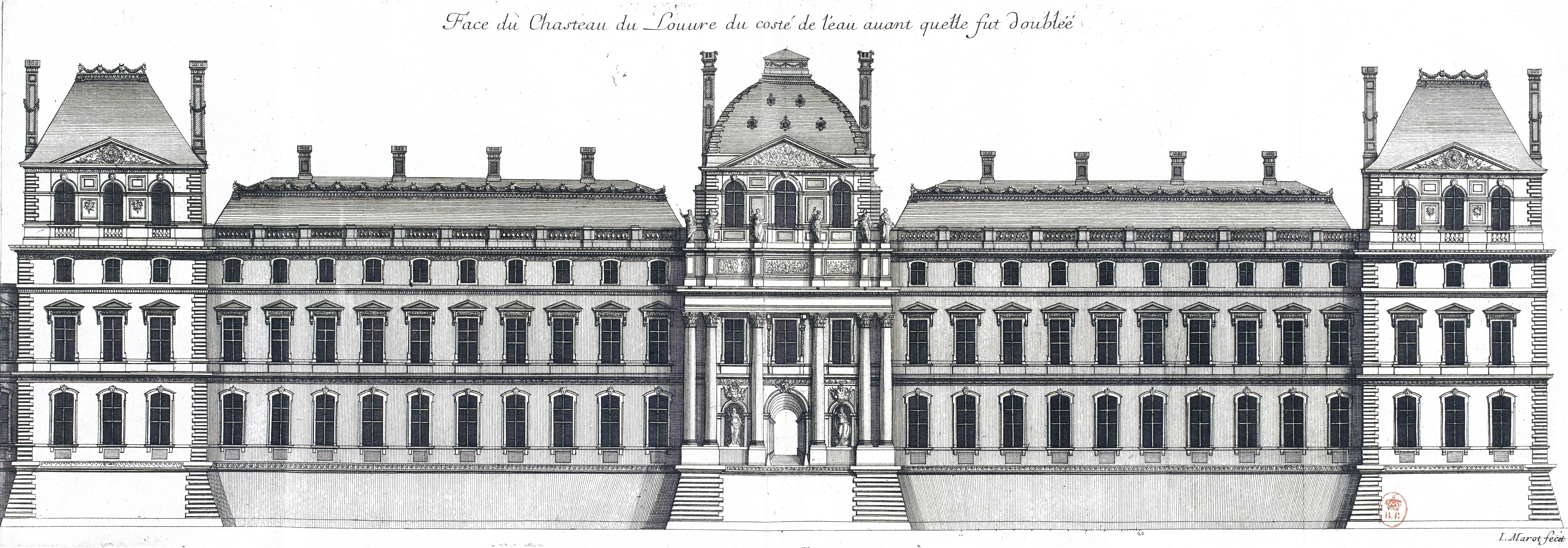
Louis Le Vau's design for the South façade, c.1660, engraved by Jean Marot

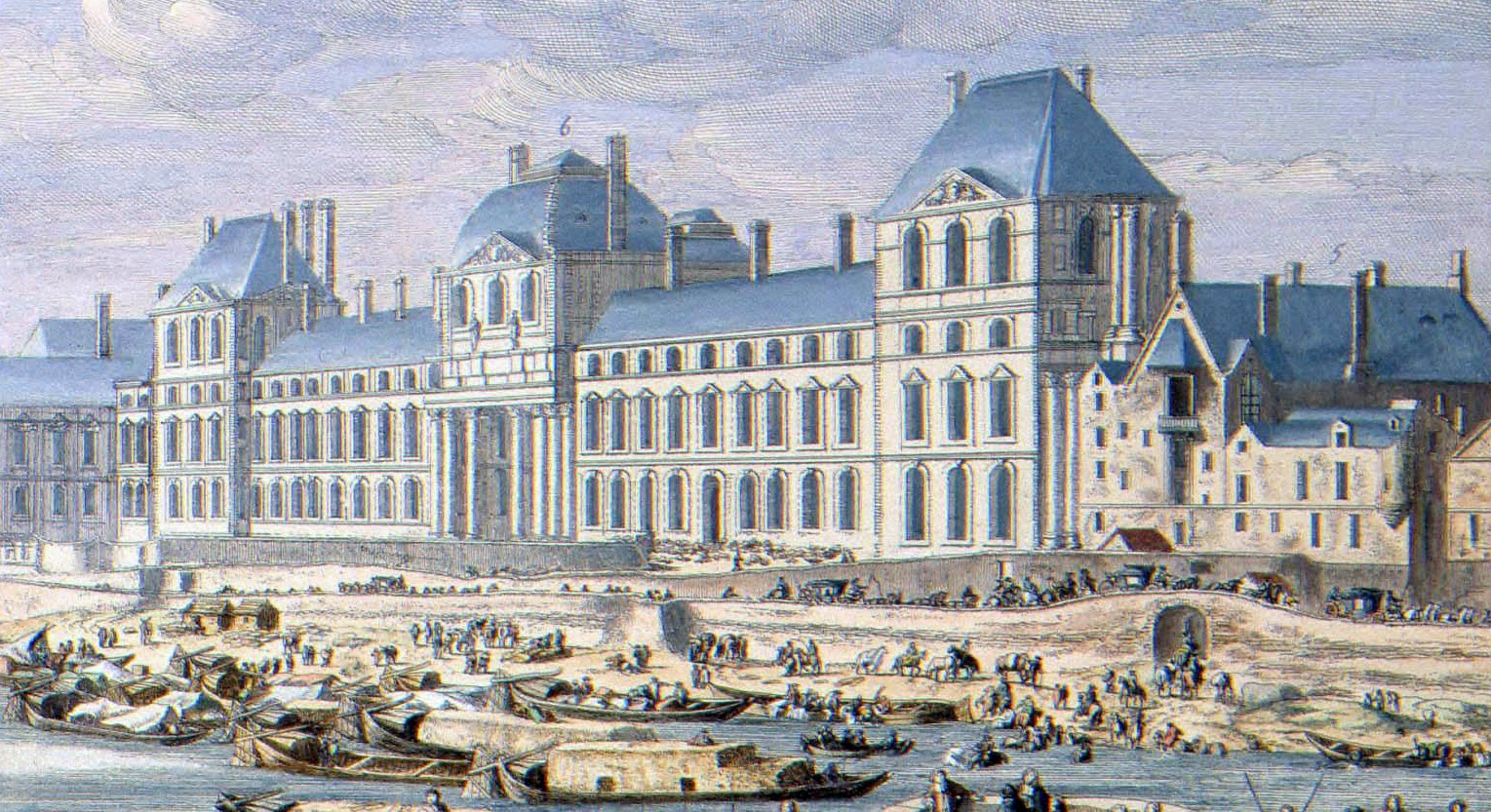
From 1660 to 1663, Louis Le Vau extended the south wing by duplicating Lescot's austere terminal pavilion and wing but providing an original central pavilion with a colossal order of engaged Corinthian columns rising from the ground (detail from an engraving by Jan van Huchtenburg after Adam Frans van der Meulen)

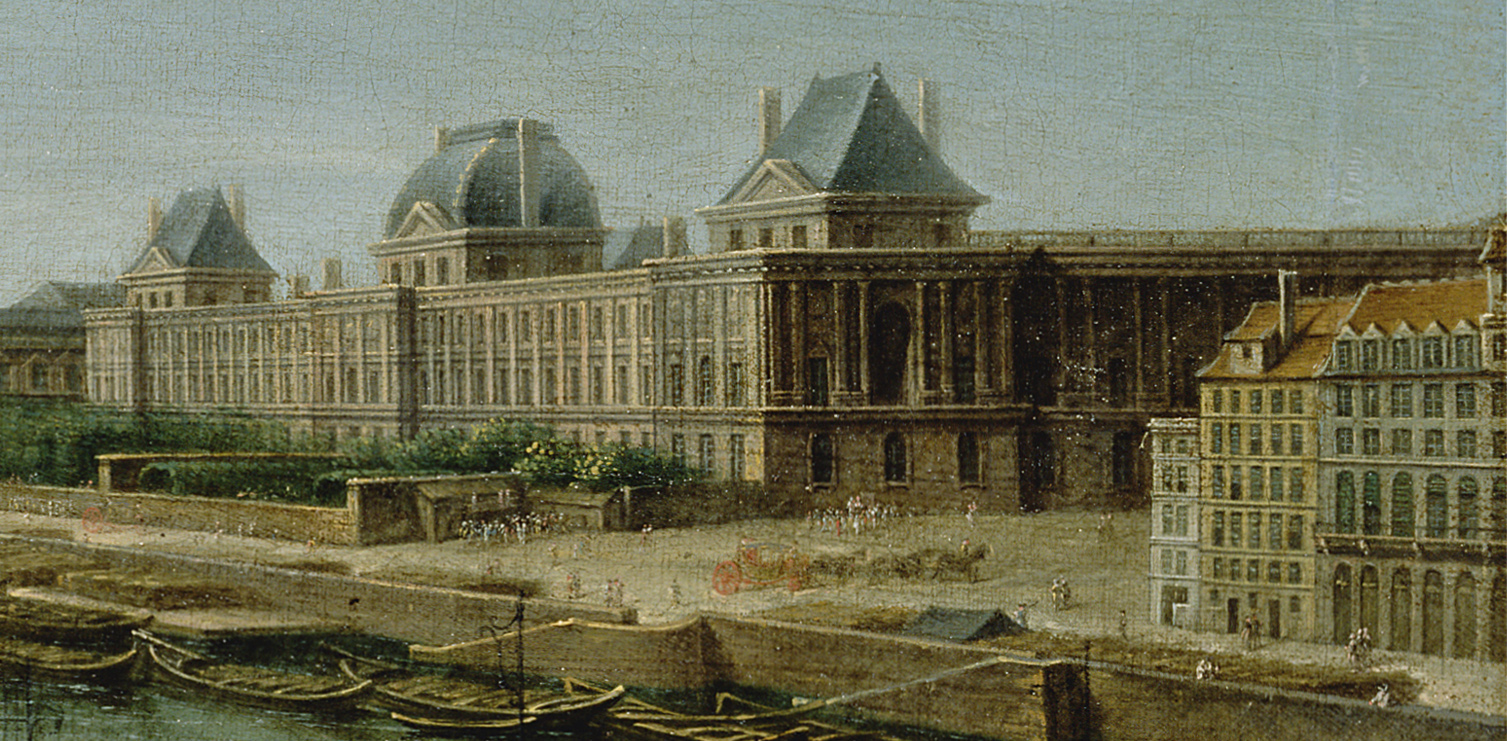
Detail from a 1763 painting by Raguenet showing the south wing with its new façade. The new rows of rooms added behind the new facade in front of Le Vau's older facade remained unroofed, and the topmost stories and steep-pitched roofs of the old pavilions had not yet been removed.

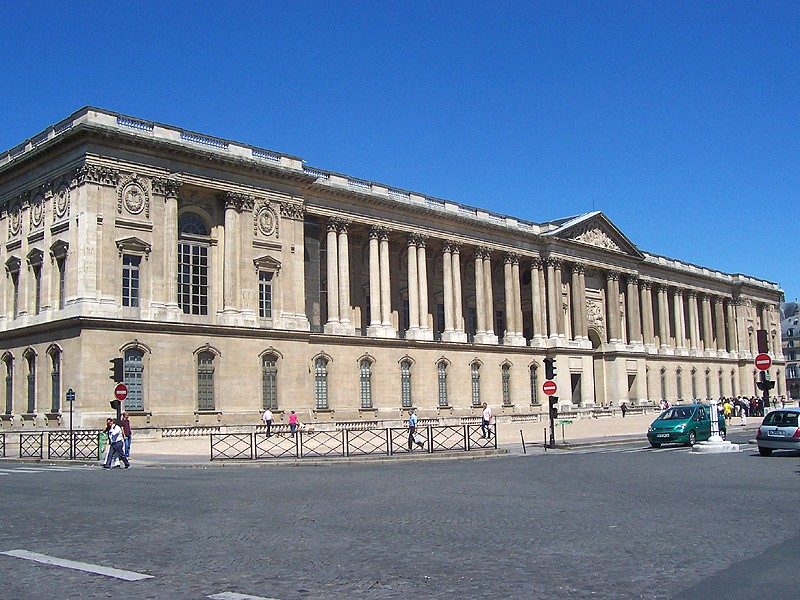
East wing of the Louvre (constructed 1667–1674), one of the most influential neoclassical façades ever built in Europe, as it appeared in 2009

=== 18th century ===
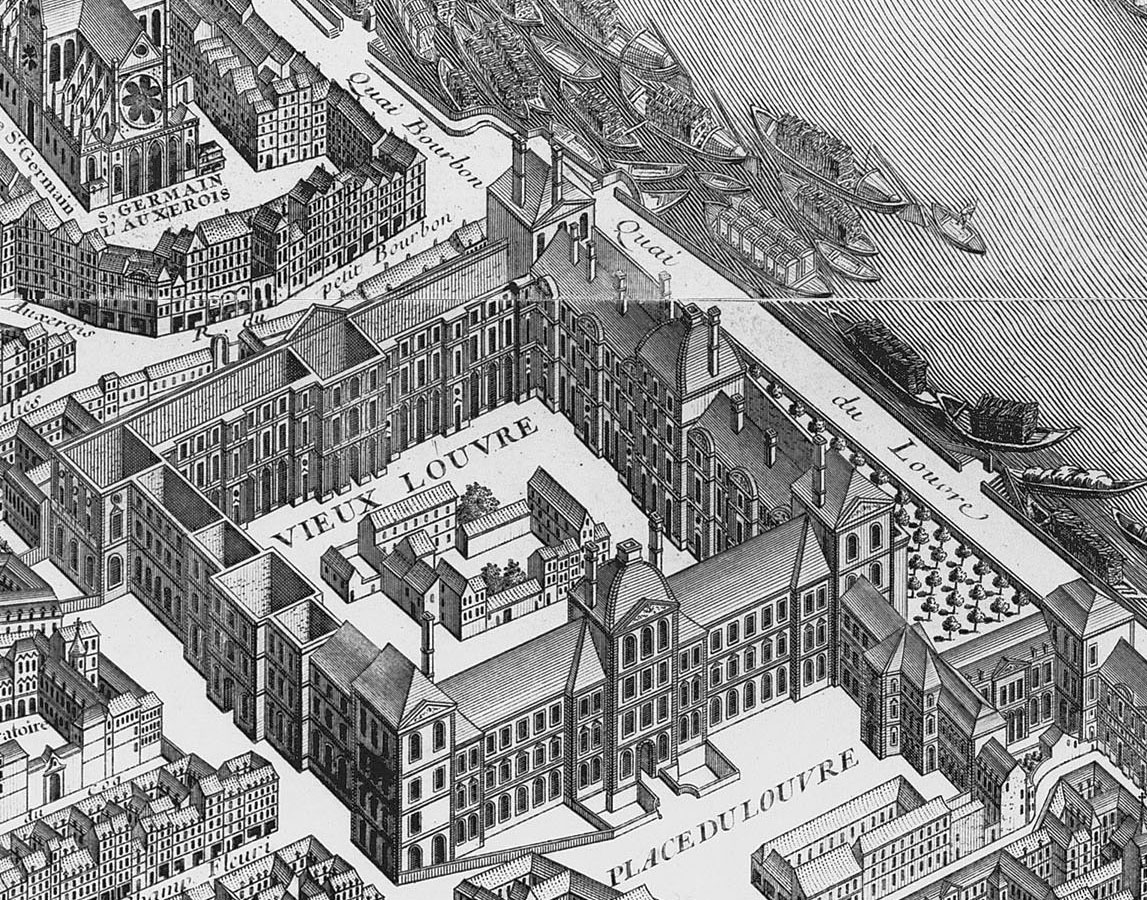
The Louvre on the Turgot map of Paris (1739) showing the unfinished wings of the Cour Carrée and new constructions in its midst

After the definitive departure of the royal court for Versailles in 1682, the Louvre became occupied by multiple individuals and organizations, either by royal favor or simply squatting. Its tenants included the Infanta Mariana Victoria of Spain during her stay in Paris in the early 1720s, artists, craftsmen, the Academies, and various royal officers. For example, in 1743 courtier and author Michel de Bonneval was granted the right to refurbish much of the wing between the Pavillon des Arts and the Pavillon Sud-Est into his own house on his own expense, including 28 rooms on the ground floor and two mezzanine levels, and an own entrance on the Cour Carrée. After Bonneval's death in 1766 his family was able to keep the house for a few more years. Some new houses were even erected in the middle of the Cour Carrée, but were eventually torn down on the initiative of the Marquis de Marigny in early 1756. A follow-up 1758 decision led to the clearance of buildings on most of what is now the Place du Louvre in front of the Colonnade, except for the remaining parts of the Hôtel du Petit-Bourbon which were preserved for a few more years.

Marigny had ambitious plans for the completion of the Cour Carrée, but their execution was cut short in the late 1750s by the adverse developments of the Seven Years' War. Jacques-Germain Soufflot in 1759 led the demolition of the upper structures of Le Vau's dome above the Pavillon des Arts, whose chimneys were in poor condition, and designed the northern and eastern passageways (guichets) of the Cour Carrée in the late 1750s. The southern Guichet des Arts was designed by Maximilien Brébion in 1779 and completed in 1780. Three arched guichets were also opened in 1760 under the Grande Galerie, through the Pavillon Lesdiguières and immediately to its west.

The 1790s were a time of turmoil for the Louvre as for the rest of France. On 5 October 1789, King Louis XVI and his court were forced to return from Versailles and settled in the Tuileries Palace; many courtiers moved into the Louvre. Many of these in turn emigrated during the French Revolution, and more artists swiftly moved into their vacated Louvre apartments.

Plan of the Louvre's first floor in 1756, by Jacques-François Blondel, showing uninhabitable and generally unroofed areas shaded (marked "A")

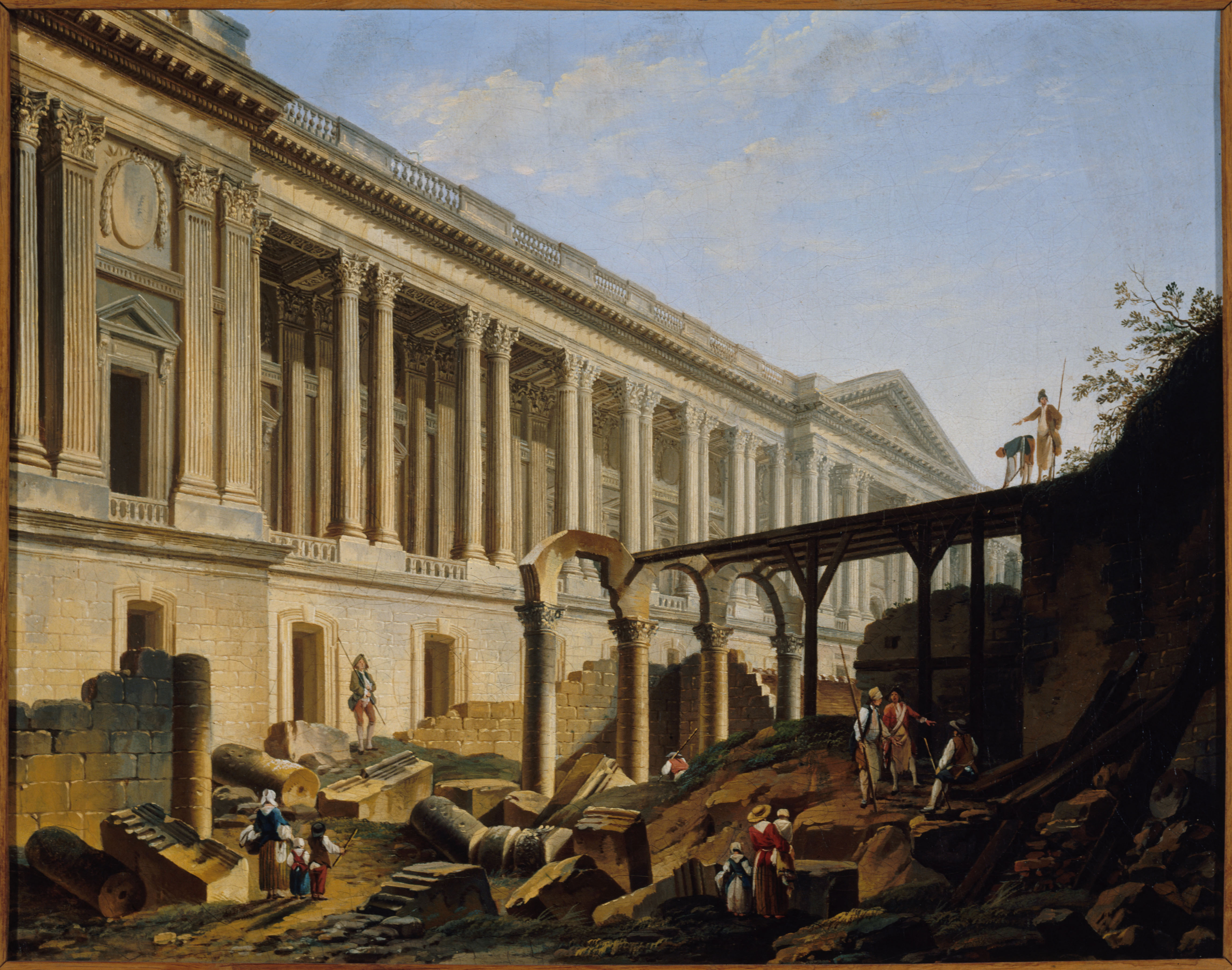
Demolition of the remaining buildings of the Hôtel du Petit-Bourbon in front of the Louvre, c.1760, by Pierre-Antoine Demachy, Musée Carnavalet

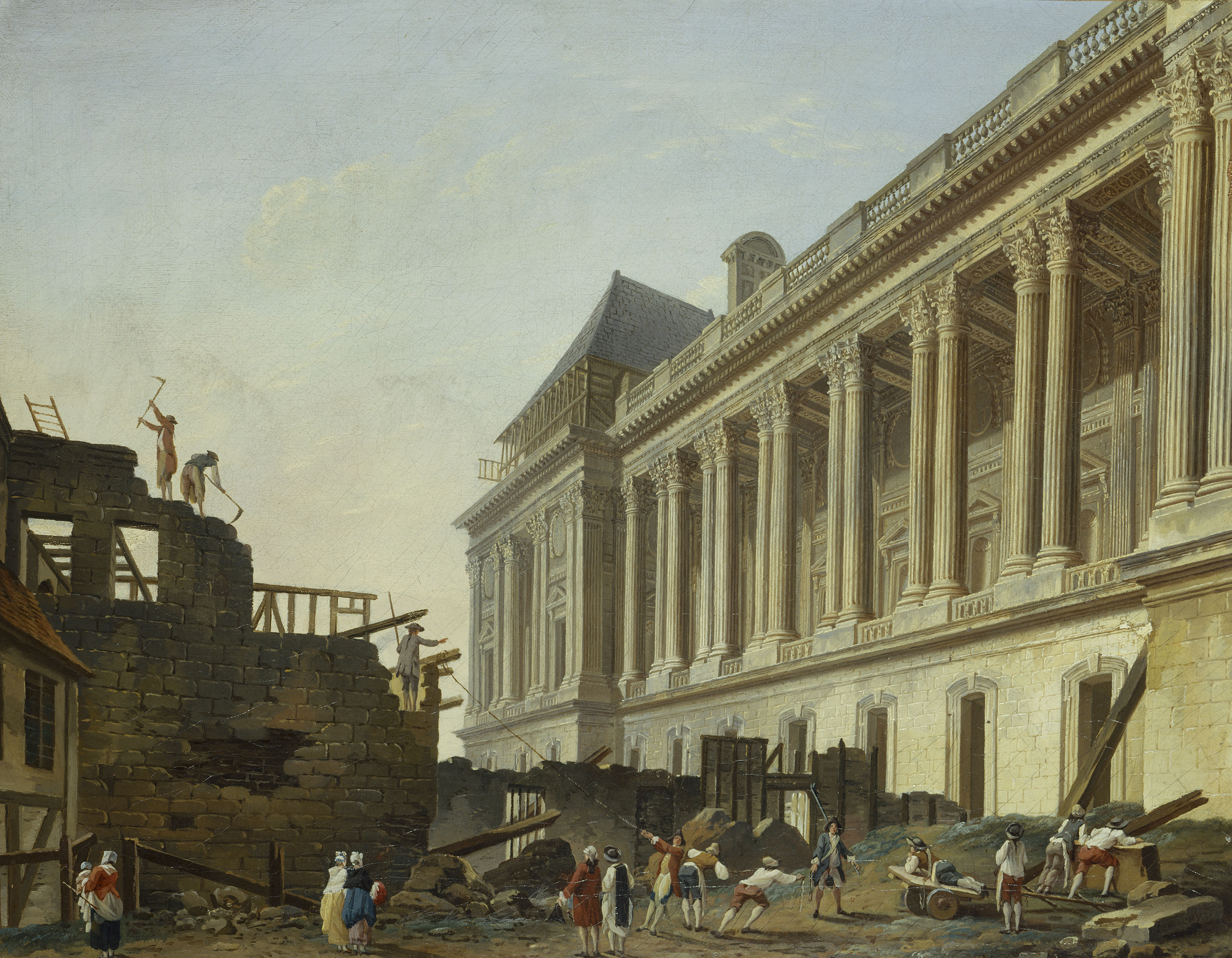
Another view of the demolitions in front of the Colonnade, by Pierre-Antoine Demachy, 1764

=== 19th century ===
In December 1804, Napoleon appointed Pierre Fontaine as architect of the Tuileries and the Louvre. Fontaine had forged a strong professional bond with his slightly younger colleague Charles Percier. Between 1805 and 1810 Percier and Fontaine completed the works of the Cour Carrée that had been left unfinished since the 1670s, despite Marigny's repairs around 1760. They opted to equalize its northern and southern wing with an attic modeled on the architecture of the Colonnade wing, thus removing the existing second-floor ornamentation and sculptures, of which some were by Jean Goujon and his workshop. The Cour Carrée and Colonnade wing were completed in 1808–1809, and Percier and Fontaine created the monumental staircase on the latter's southern and northern ends between 1807 and 1811. Percier and Fontaine also created the monumental decoration of most of the ground-floor rooms around the Cour Carrée, most of which still retain it, including their renovation of Jean Goujon's Salle des Caryatides. On the first floor, they recreated the former Salle Haute of the Lescot Wing, which had been partitioned in the 18th century, and gave it double height by creating a visitors' gallery in what had formerly been the Lescot Wing's attic.

Further west, Percier and Fontaine created the monumental entrance for the Louvre Museum (called Musée Napoléon since 1804). This opened from what was at the time called the Place du Louvre, abutting the Lescot Wing to the west, into the Rotonde de Mars, the monumental room at the northern end of the Appartement d'été d'Anne d'Autriche. The entrance door was dominated by a colossal bronze head of the Emperor by Lorenzo Bartolini, installed in 1805. Visitors could either visit the classical antiquities collection (Musée des Antiques) in Anne of Austria's rooms or in the redecorated ground floor of the Cour Carrée's southern wing to the left, or they could turn right and access Percier and Fontaine's new monumental staircase, leading to both the Salon Carré and the Rotonde d'Apollon (formerly Salon du Dôme) on the first floor (replaced in the 1850s by the Escalier Daru). The two architects also remade the interior design of the Grande Galerie, in which they created nine sections separated by groups of monumental columns, and a system of roof lighting with lateral skylights.

On the eastern front of the Tuileries Palace, Percier and Fontaine had the existing buildings cleared away to create a vast open space, the Cour du Carrousel, which they had closed with an iron fence in 1801. Somewhat ironically, the clearance effort was facilitated by the Plot of the rue Saint-Nicaise, a failed bomb attack on Napoleon on 24 December 1800, which damaged many of the neighborhood's building that were later demolished without compensation. In the middle of the Cour du Carrousel, the Arc de Triomphe du Carrousel was erected in 1806–1808 to commemorate Napoleon's military victories. On 10 April 1810, Percier and Fontaine's plan for the completion of the Grand Dessein of uniting the Louvre and the Tuileries was approved, following a design competition among forty-seven participants. Works started immediately afterwards to build an entirely new wing starting from the Pavillon de Marsan, with the intent to expand it all the way to the Pavillon de Beauvais on the northwestern corner of the Cour Carrée. By the end of Napoleon's rule the works had progressed up to the rue de l'Échelle. The architectural design of the southern façade of that wing replicated that attributed to Jacques II Androuet du Cerceau for the western section of the Grande Galerie.

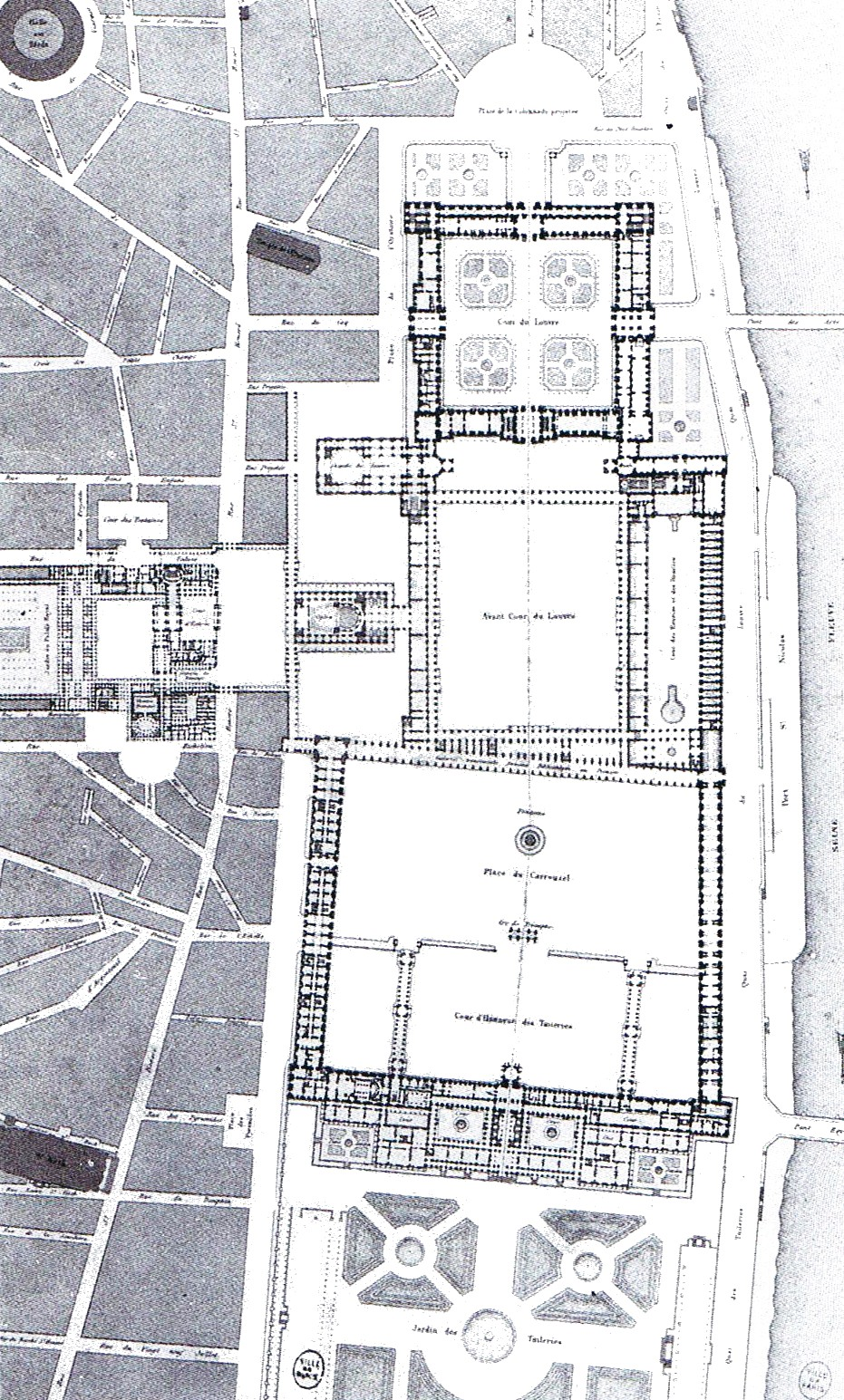
One version of Percier and Fontaine's plan for uniting the Louvre and Tuileries

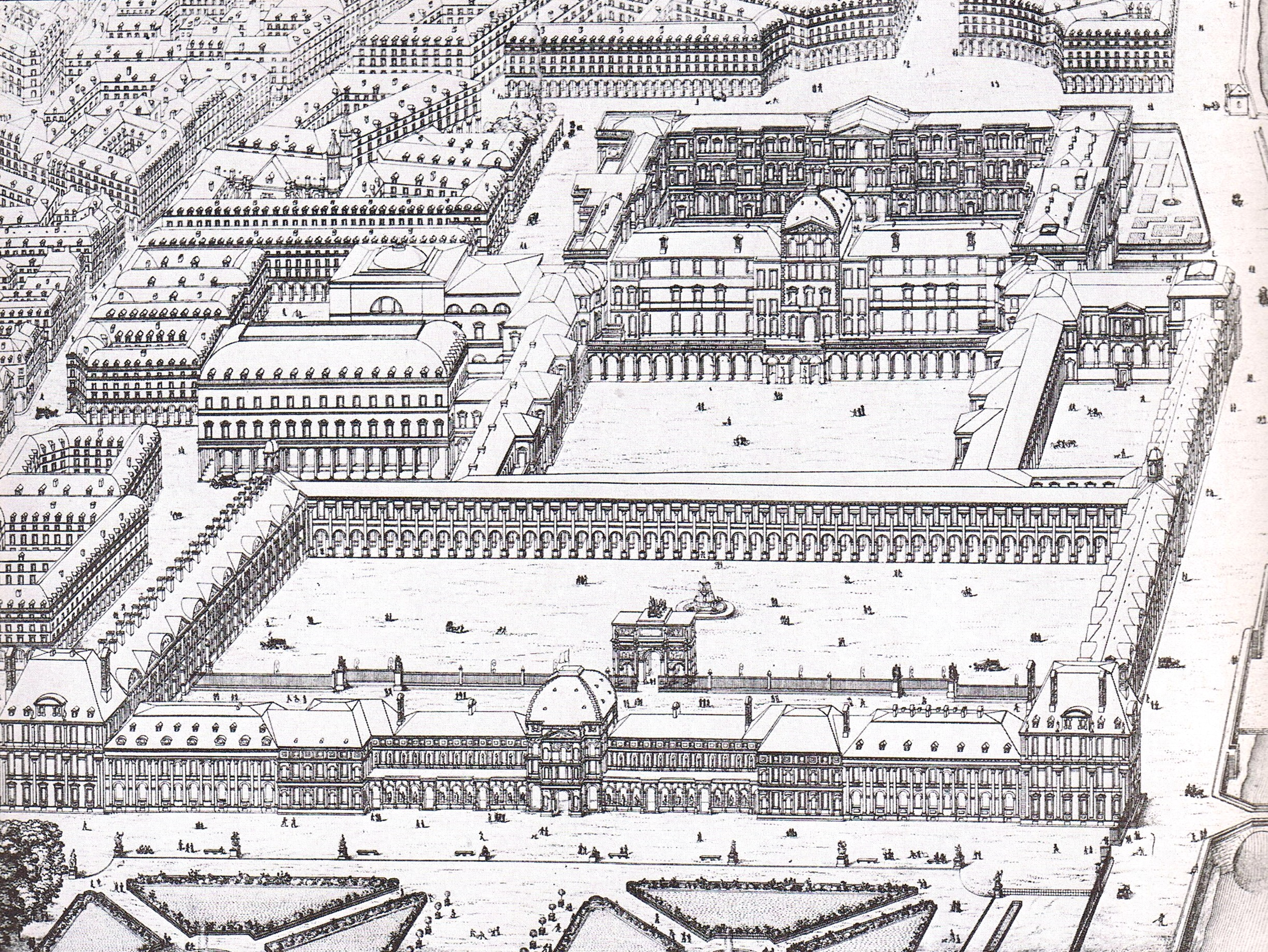
Percier and Fontaine's perspective of the proposed Louvre viewed from the west . Inspiration for the later Visconti work.

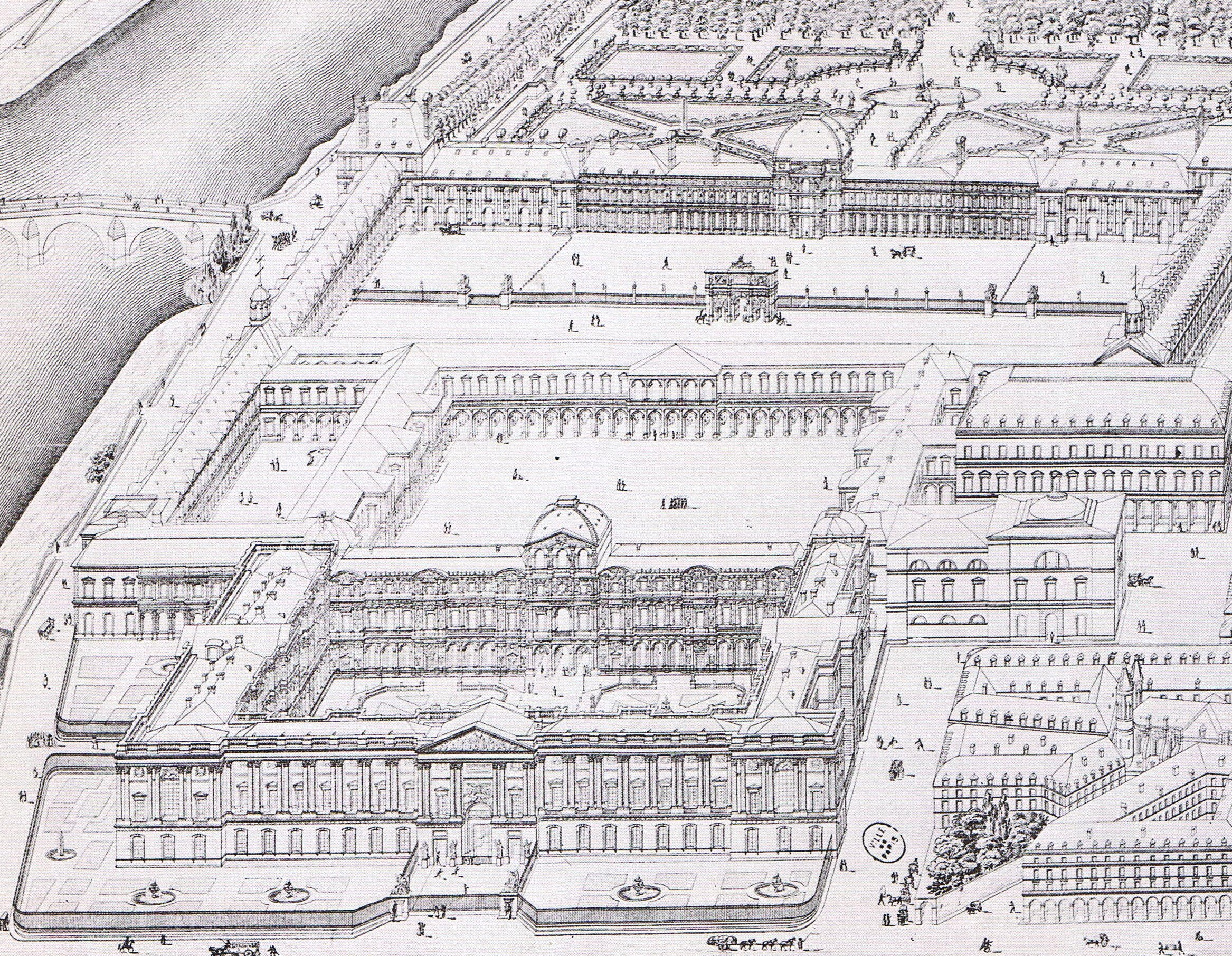
Percier and Fontaine's perspective of the proposed Louvre viewed from the east (c. 1809). Inspiration for the later Visconti work.

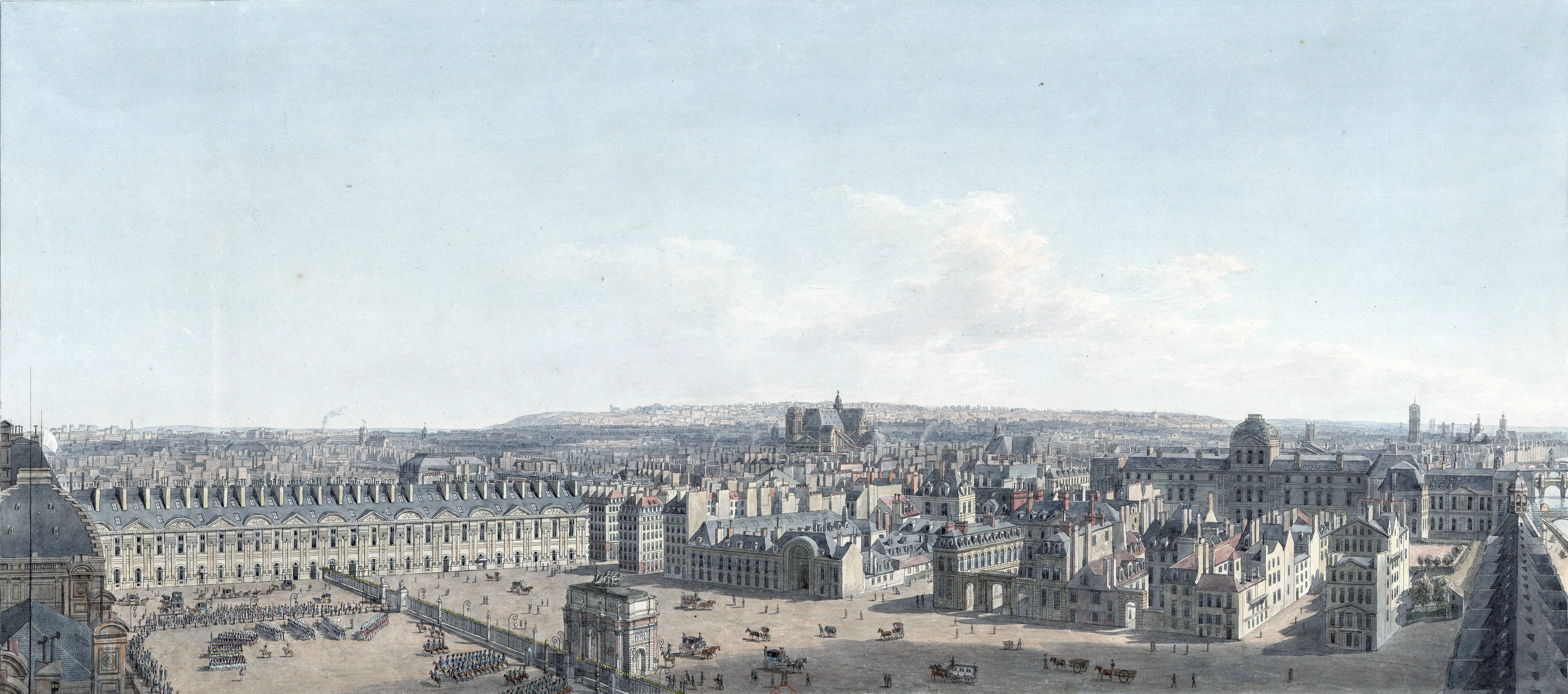
The Louvre viewed from the Pavillon de Flore, anonymous drawing held at the Bibliothèque nationale de France, 1828

Percier and Fontaine were retained by Louis XVIII at the beginning of the Bourbon Restoration, and kept working on the decoration projects they had started under Napoleon. The Escalier du Midi was opened to the public on 25 August 1819. But there were no further budget allocations for the completion of the Louvre Palace during the reigns of Louis XVIII, Charles X and Louis-Philippe I, while the kings resided in the Tuileries. By 1825, Percier and Fontaine's northern wing had only been built up to the rue de Rohan, and made no progress in the following 25 years. Further attempts at budget appropriations to complete the Louvre, led by Adolphe Thiers in 1833 and again in 1840, were rejected by the Chamber of Deputies.

From the early days of the Second Republic, a greater level of ambition for the Louvre was again signaled. On 24 March 1848, the provisional government published an order that renamed the Louvre as the Palais du Peuple ("People's Palace") and heralded the project to complete it and dedicate it to the exhibition of art and industry as well as the National Library. In a February 1849 speech at the National Assembly, Victor Hugo described the project as making the Louvre into a focal point for world culture, which he referred to a "Mecca of intelligence".

During the Republic's brief existence, the palace was extensively restored by Louvre architect Félix Duban, especially the exterior façades of the Petite Galerie and Grande Galerie, on which Duban designed the ornate portal now known as Porte Barbet-de-Jouy. Meanwhile, Duban restored or completed several of the Louvre's main interior spaces, especially the salle des Sept-Cheminées, Galerie d'Apollon and Salon Carré, which Prince-President Louis Napoleon inaugurated on 5 June 1851 Expropriation arrangements were made for the completion of the Louvre and the rue de Rivoli, and the remaining buildings that cluttered the space that is now the Cour Napoléon were cleared away.. No new buildings had been started, however, by the time of the December 1851 coup d'état.

On this basis, Napoleon III was able to finally unite the Louvre with the Tuileries in a single, coherent building complex. The plan of the Louvre's expansion were made by Louis Visconti, a disciple of Percier, who died suddenly in December 1853 and was succeeded in early 1854 by Hector Lefuel. Lefuel developed Visconti's plan into a higher and more ornate building concept, and executed it at record speed so that the "Nouveau Louvre" was inaugurated by the Emperor on 14 August 1857. The new buildings were arranged around the space then called Place Napoléon-III, later Square du Louvre and, since the 20th century, Cour Napoléon. Before his death, Visconti also had time to rearrange the Louvre's gardens outside the Cour Carrée, namely the Jardin de l'Infante to the south, the Jardin de la Colonnade to the east and the Jardin de l'Oratoire to the north, and also designed the Orangerie and Jeu de Paume on the western end of the Tuileries Garden. In the 1860s, Lefuel also demolished the Pavillon de Flore and nearly half of the Grande Galerie, and reconstructed them on a modified design that included the passageway known as the Guichet de l'Empereur (later Porte du Sud, now Porte des Lions), a new Pavillon des Sessions for state functions, and the monumental Guichets du Carrousel replacing those created in 1760 near the Pavillon Lesdiguières.

At the end of the Paris Commune on 23 May 1871, the Tuileries Palace was burned down, as also was the Louvre Imperial Library in what is now the Richelieu Wing. The rest of palace, including the museum, was saved by the efforts of troopers, firemen and museum curators.

In the 1870s, the ever-resourceful Lefuel led the repairs to the Pavillon de Flore between 1874 and 1879, reconstructed the wing that had hosted the Louvre Library between 1873 and 1875, and the Pavillon de Marsan between 1874 and 1879. In 1877, a bronze Genius of Arts by Antonin Mercié was installed in the place of Antoine-Louis Barye's equestrian statue of Napoleon III, which had been toppled in September 1870.

Meanwhile, the fate of the Tuileries' ruins kept being debated. Both Lefuel and influential architect Eugène Viollet-le-Duc advocated their preservation and the building reconstruction, but after the latter died in 1879 and Lefuel in 1880, the Third Republic opted to erase that memory of the former monarchy. The final decision was made in 1882 and executed in 1883, thus forever changing the Louvre's layout. Later projects to rebuild the Tuileries have resurfaced intermittently but never went very far.

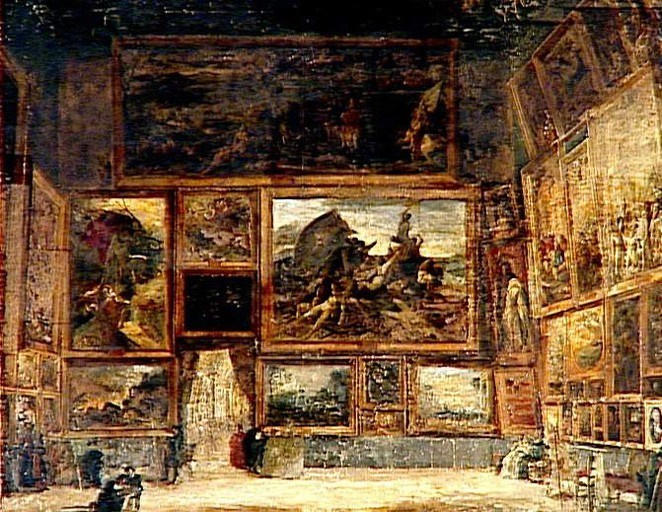
The Salon held in 1831 in the eponymous Salon Carré, painted by Nicolas Sébastien Maillot and showing Géricault's The Raft of the Medusa in the middle

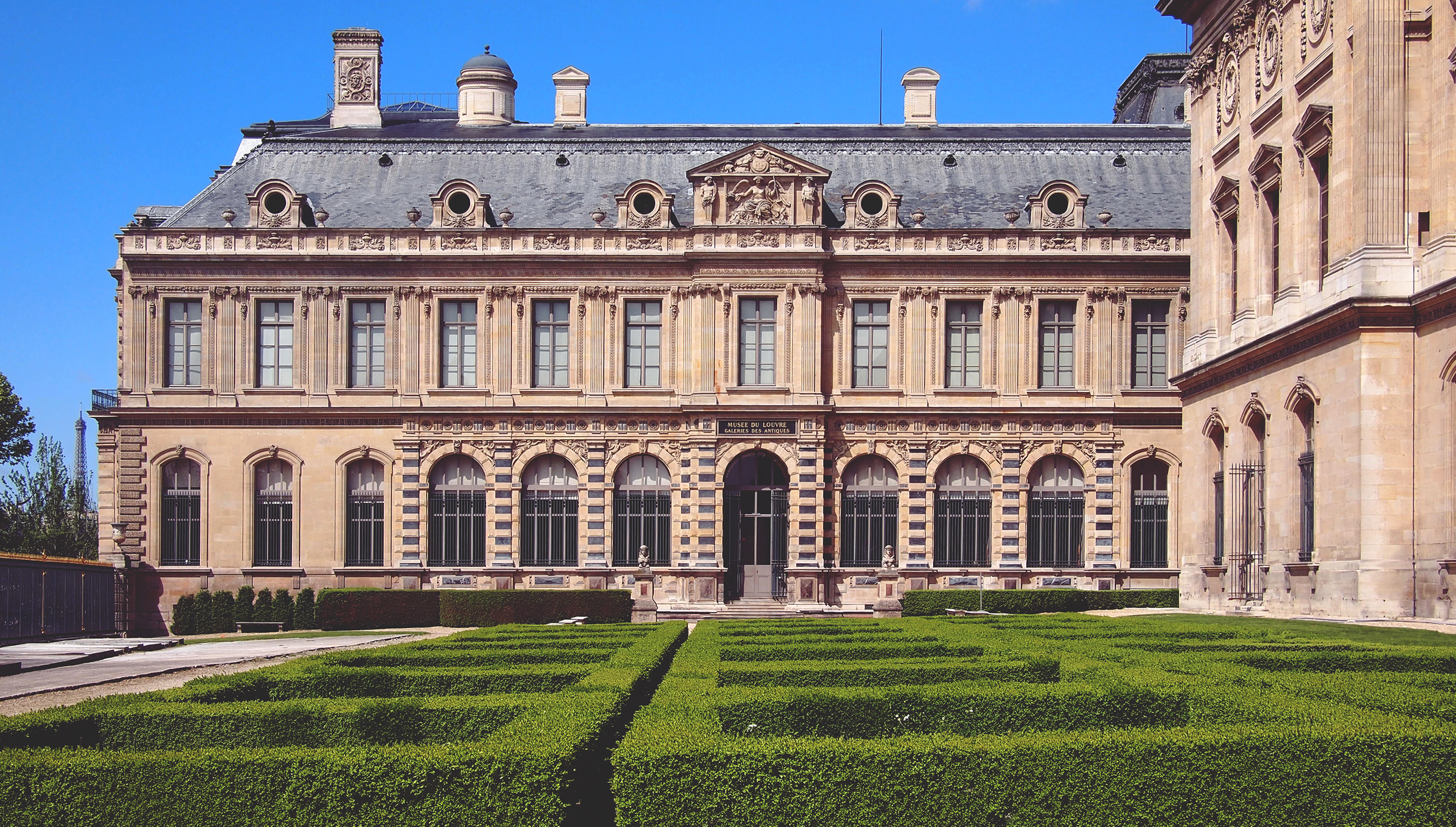
The eastern façade of the Petite Galerie following its extensive exterior restoration by Félix Duban

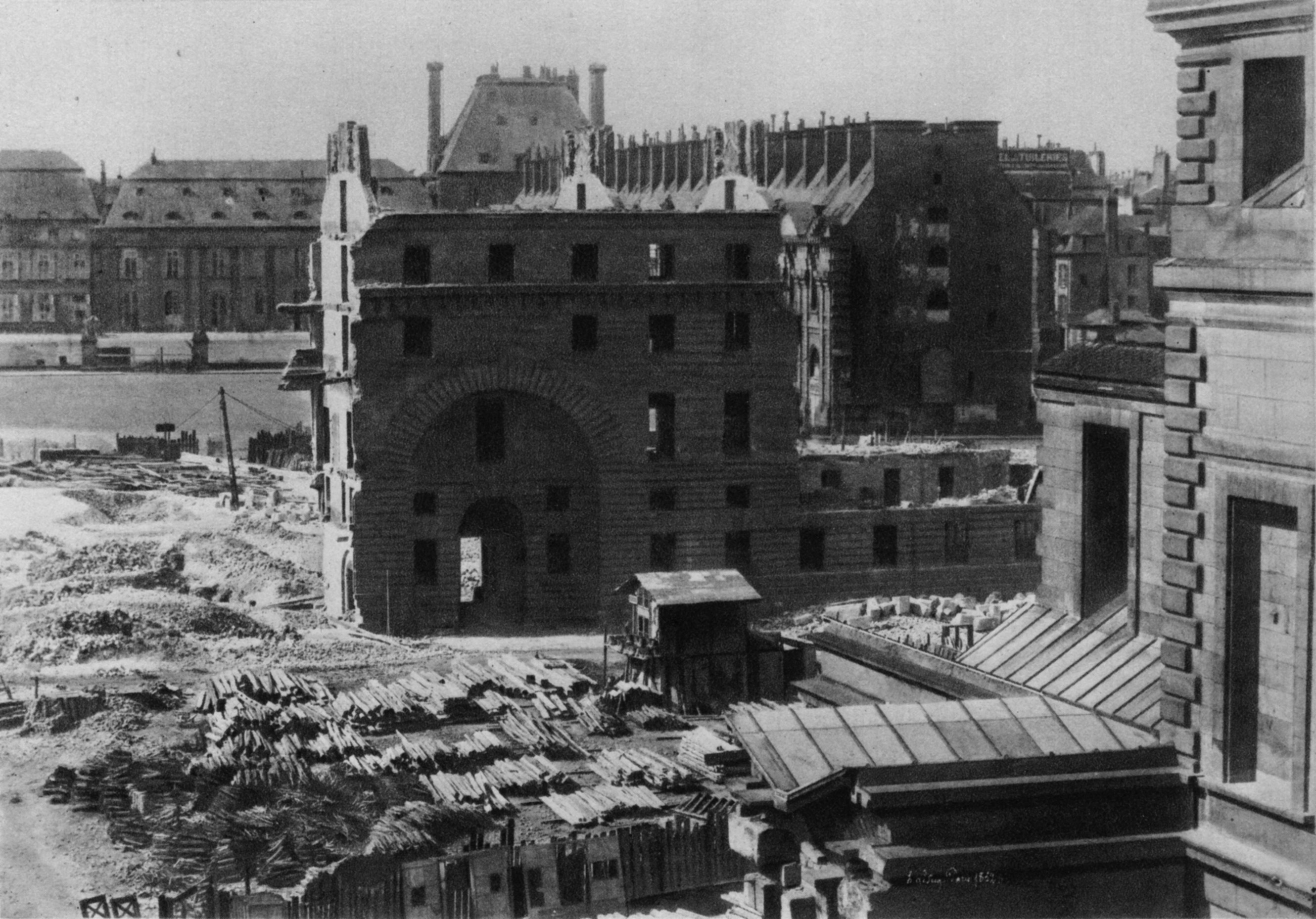
Demolition of the last buildings on the Place du Carrousel in 1852, with the Tuileries Palace and the Pavillon de Marsan in the background

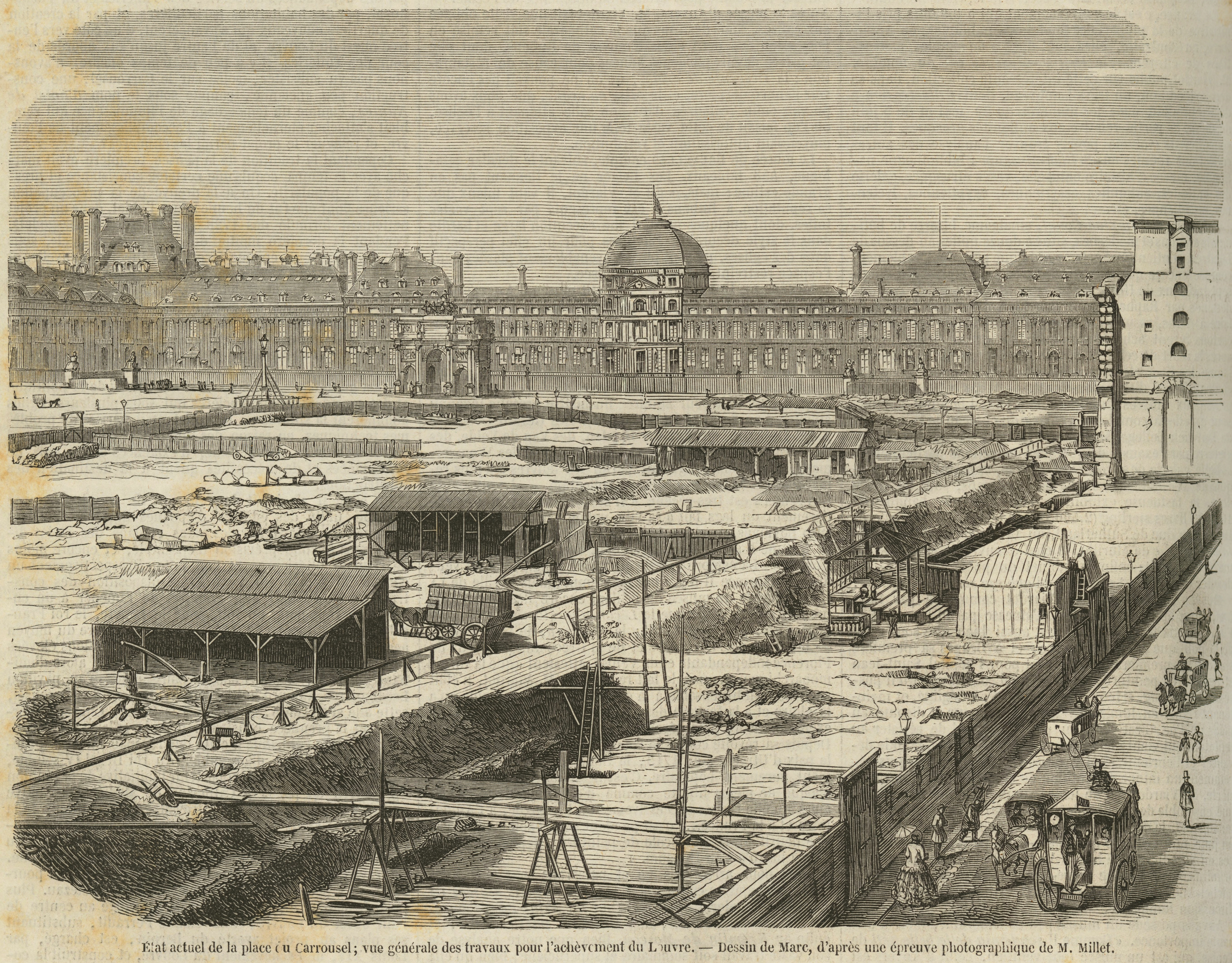
The North (Richelieu) Wing under construction, with the Pavillon de Flore and the Tuileries in the background

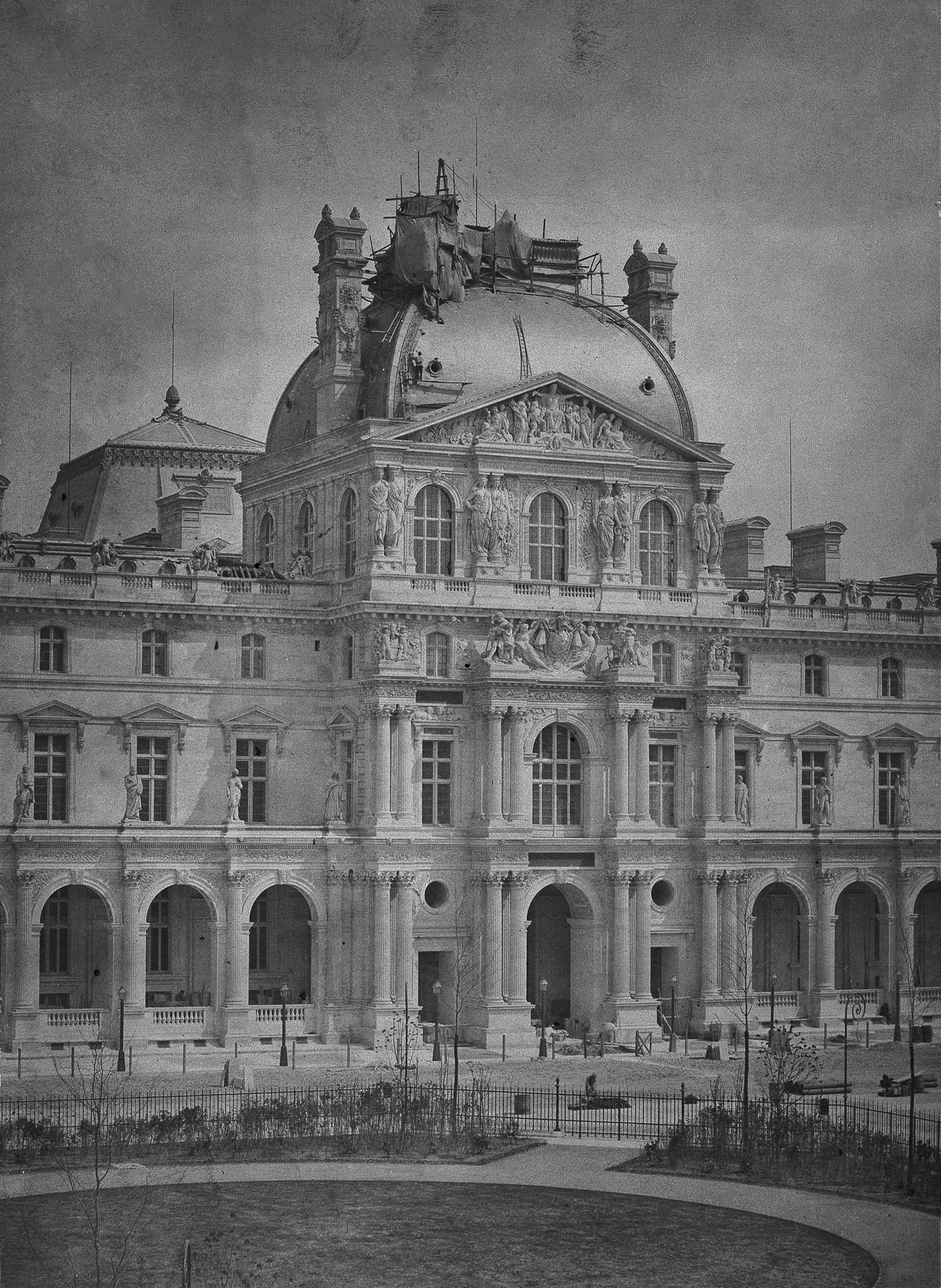
The brand-new Pavillon Richelieu photographed in the late 1850s

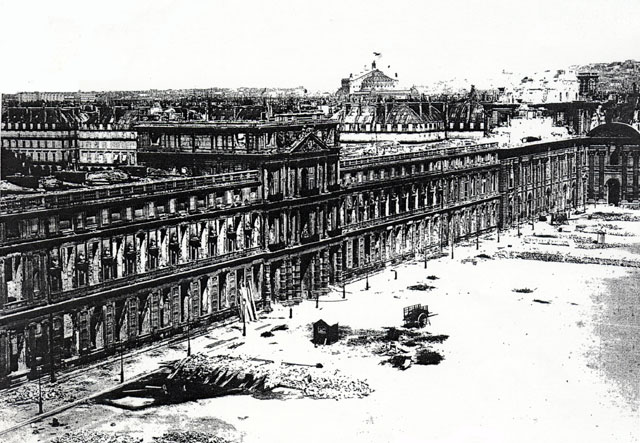
The Tuileries Palace was set afire by the Communards during the suppression of the Paris Commune in May 1871

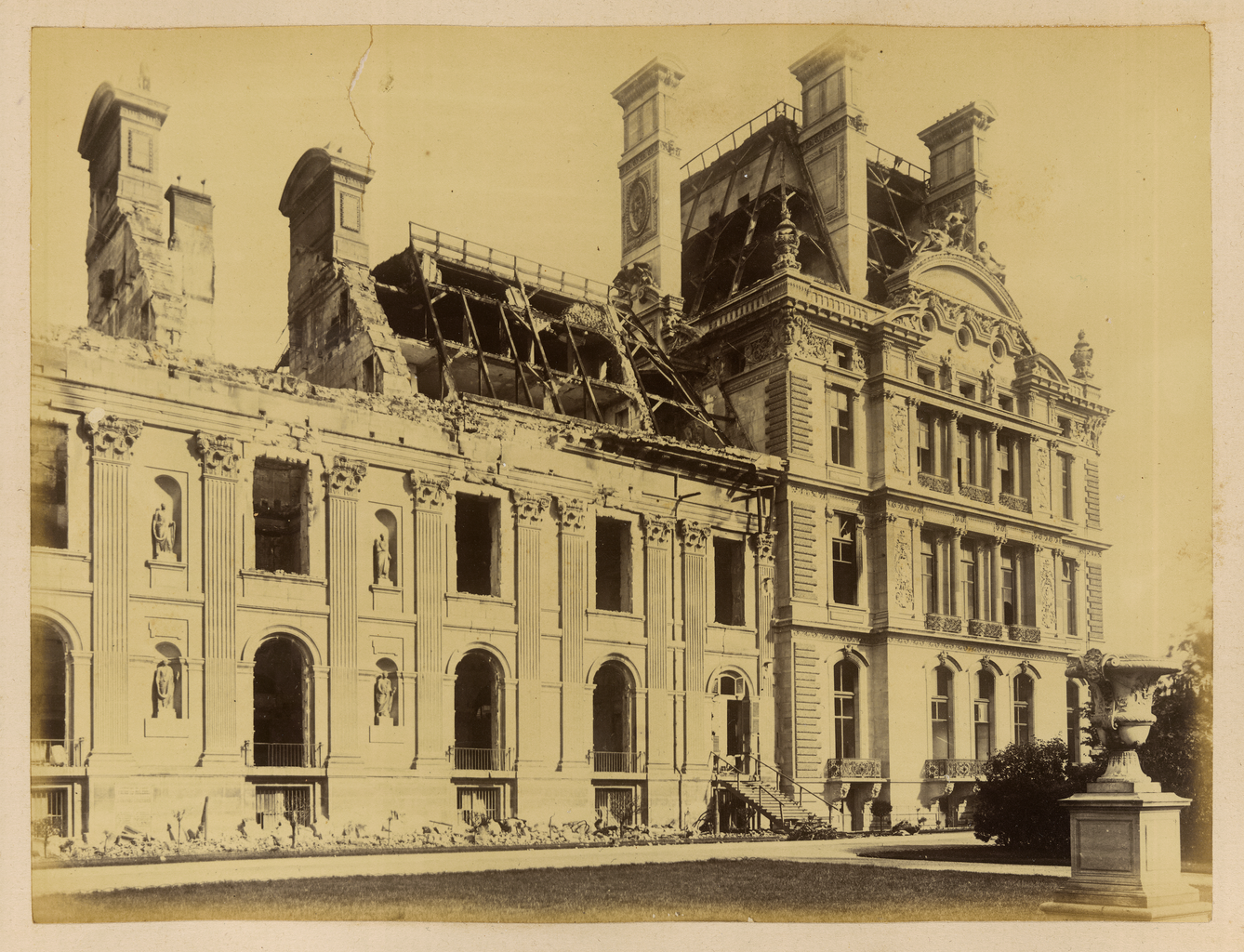
The Tuileries (left) and Pavillon de Flore (right) damaged after the 1871 fire, showing the greater damage to the former than to the latter

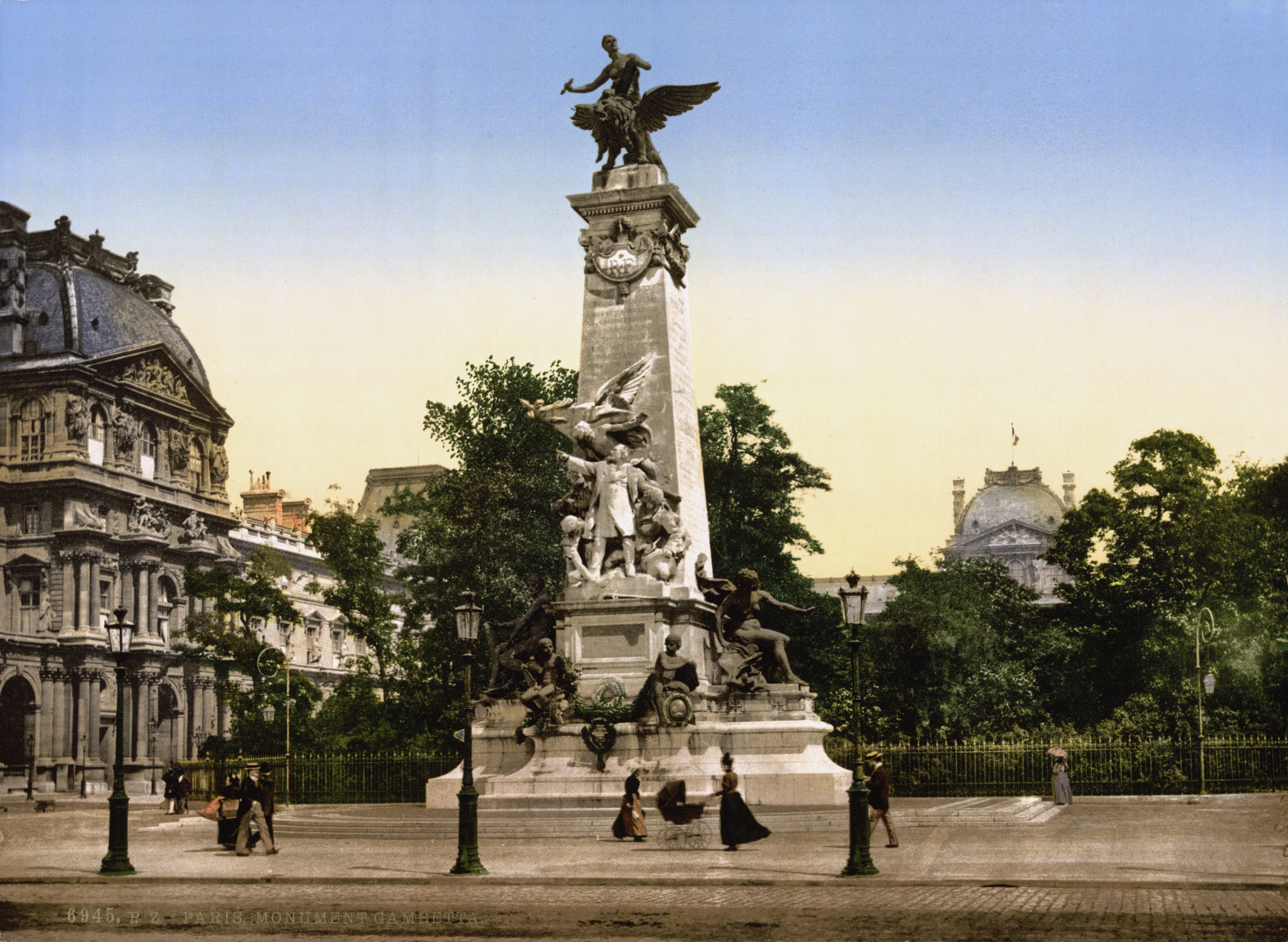
The Gambetta monument in the Cour Napoléon, c. 1900

A tall monument to Léon Gambetta was planned in 1884 and erected in 1888 in front of the two gardens on what is now the Cour Napoléon. That initiative carried heavy political symbolism, since Gambetta was widely viewed as the founder of the Third Republic, and his outsized celebration in the middle of Napoleon III's landmark thus affirmed the final victory of republicanism over monarchism nearly a century after the French Revolution. Most of the monument's sculptures were in bronze and in 1941 were melted for military use by German occupying forces. What remained of the Gambetta Monument was dismantled in 1954.

=== 20th century ===
Some long unfinished parts of Lefuel's expansion were only completed in the early 20th century, such as the Decorative Arts Museum in the Marsan Wing, by Gaston Redon, and the arch between the Escalier Mollien and Salle Mollien, designed by Victor-Auguste Blavette and built in 1910–1914.

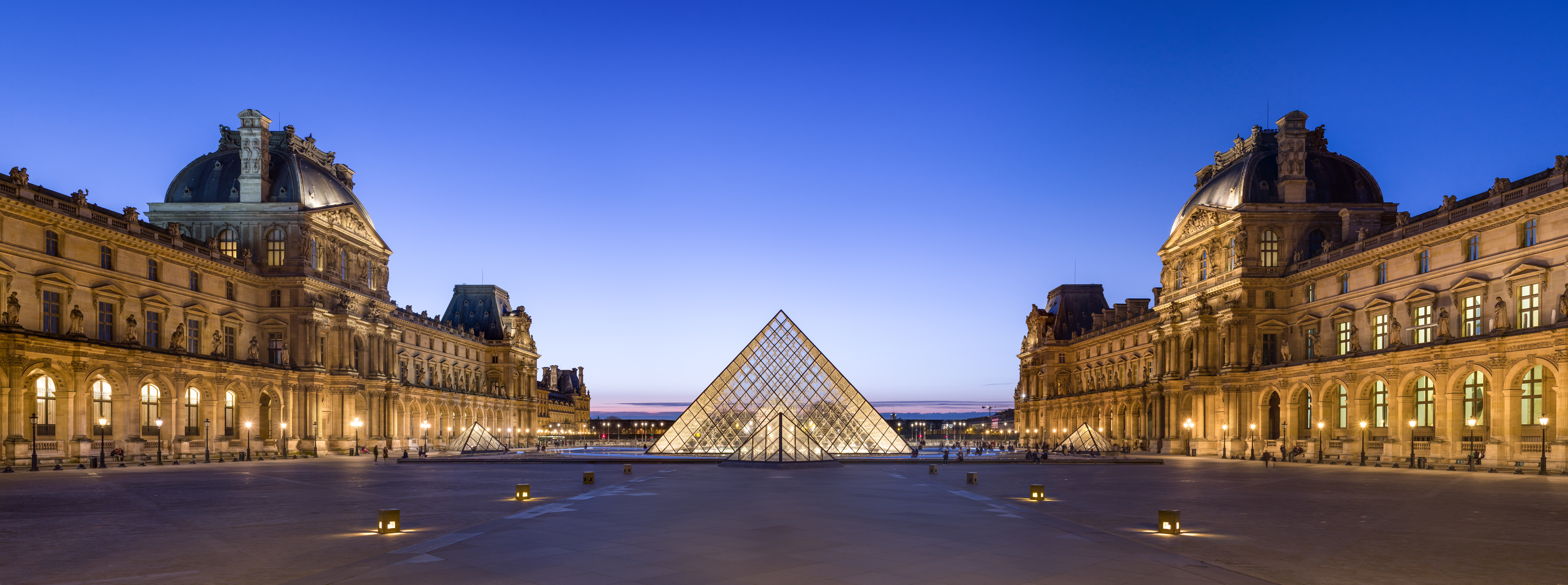
The Napoleon Courtyard, with Ieoh Ming Pei's pyramid in its center, at dusk

Aside from the interior refurbishment of the Pavillon de Flore in the 1960s, there was little change to the Louvre's architecture during most of the 20th century. The most notable was the initiative taken in 1964 by minister André Malraux to excavate and reveal the basement level of the Louvre Colonnade, thus removing the Jardin de la Colonnade and giving the Place du Louvre its current shape.

In September 1981, newly elected French President François Mitterrand proposed the Grand Louvre plan to move the Finance Ministry out of the Richelieu Wing, allowing the museum to expand dramatically. American architect I. M. Pei was awarded the project and in late 1983 proposed a modernist glass pyramid for the central courtyard. The Louvre Pyramid and its underground lobby, the Hall Napoléon, opened to the public on 29 March 1989. A second phase of the Grand Louvre project, completed in 1993, created underground space below the Place du Carrousel to accommodate car parks, multi-purpose exhibition halls and a shopping mall named Carrousel du Louvre. Daylight is provided at the intersection of its axes by the Louvre Inverted Pyramid (la pyramide inversée), "a humorous reference to its bigger, right-side-up sister upstairs." The Louvre's new spaces in the reconstructed Richelieu Wing were near-simultaneously inaugurated in November 1993. The third phase of the Grand Louvre, mostly executed by the late 1990s, involved the refurbishment of the museum's galleries in the Sully and Denon Wings where much exhibition space had been freed during the project second phase.

=== 21st century ===
The renovation of the Carrousel Garden was also completed in 2001.

== Uses ==
Whereas the name "Louvre Palace" refers to its intermittent role as a monarchical residence, this is neither its original nor its present function. The Louvre has always been associated with French state power and representation, under many modalities that have varied within the vast building and across its long history. Percier and Fontaine thus captured something of the long-term identity of the Louvre when they described it in 1833 as "viewed as the shrine of [French] monarchy, now much less devoted to the usual residence of the sovereign than to the great state functions, pomp, festivities, solennities and public ceremonies." Except at the very beginning of its existence, as a fortress, and at the very end (nearly exclusively) as a museum building, the Louvre Palace has continuously hosted a variety of different activities.

=== Military facility ===
The Louvre started as a military facility and retained military uses during most of its history. The initial rationale in 1190 for building a reinforced fortress on the western end of the new fortifications of Paris was the lingering threat of English-held Normandy. After the construction of the Wall of Charles V, the Louvre was still part of the defensive arrangements for the city, as the wall continued along the Seine between it and the Tour du Bois farther west, but it was no longer on the frontline. In the next centuries, there was no rationale for specific defenses of the Louvre against foreign invasion, but the palace long retained defensive features such as moats to guard against the political troubles that regularly engulfed Paris. The Louvre hosted a significant arsenal in the 15th and most of the 16th centuries, until its transfer in 1572 to the facility that is now the Bibliothèque de l'Arsenal.

From 1697 on, the French state's collection of plans-reliefs was stored in the Grande Galerie, of which it occupied all the space by 1754 with about 120 items placed on wooden tables. The plans-reliefs were used to study and prepare defensive and offensive siege operations of the fortified cities and strongholds they represented. In 1777, as plans started being made to create a museum in the Grande Galerie, the plans-reliefs were removed to the Hôtel des Invalides, where most of them are still displayed in the Musée des Plans-Reliefs. Meanwhile, a collection of models of ships and navy yards, initially started by naval engineer Henri-Louis Duhamel du Monceau, was displayed between 1752 and 1793 in a Salle de Marine next to the Académie des Sciences's rooms on the first floor of the Lescot Wing. That collection later formed the core of the maritime museum created in 1827, which remained at the Louvre until 1943 and is now the Musée national de la Marine.

During Napoleon III's Louvre expansion, the new building program included barracks for the Imperial Guard in the new North (Richelieu) Wing, and for the Cent-gardes Squadron in the South (Denon) Wing.

=== Feudal apex ===
The round keep of Philip II's Louvre Castle became the symbolic location from which all the king's fiefs depended. The traditional formula for these, that they "depended on the king for his great keep of the Louvre" (relevant du roi à cause de sa grosse tour du Louvre) remained in use until the 18th century, long after the keep itself had been demolished in the 1520s.

=== Archive ===
Philip II also created a permanent repository for the royal archive at the Louvre, following the loss of the French kings' previously itinerant records at the Battle of Fréteval (1194). That archive, known as the Trésor des Chartes, was relocated under Louis IX to the Palais de la Cité in 1231.

A number of state archives were again lodged in the Louvre's vacant spaces in the 18th century, e.g. the minutes of the Conseil des Finances in the attic of the Lescot Wing, and the archives of the Conseil du Roi in several ground-floor rooms in the late 1720s. The kingdom's diplomatic archives were kept in the Pavillon de l'Horloge until their transfer to Versailles in 1763, after which the archives of the Maison du Roi and of the Bureau de la Ville de Paris soon took their place. In 1770, the archives of the Chambre des Comptes were placed in the Louvre's attic, followed by the archives of the Marshals of France in 1778 and those of the Order of Saint Michael in 1780. In 1825, after the Conseil d'État had been relocated to the Lemercier Wing, its archives were moved to the entresol below the Grande Galerie, near the Bibliothèque du Louvre.

=== Prison ===
The Louvre became a high-profile prison in the immediate aftermath of the Battle of Bouvines in July 1214, as Ferdinand, Count of Flanders was taken into captivity by Philip II. Ferdinand stayed there for 12 years. Other celebrity inmates included Enguerrand IV de Coucy in 1259, Guy of Flanders in 1304, Bishop Guichard de Troyes in 1308–1313, Louis de Dampierre in 1310, Enguerrand de Marigny in 1314, John of Montfort in 1341–1345, Charles II of Navarre in 1356, and Jean III de Grailly from 1372 to his death there in 1375. The Louvre was reserved for high-ranking prisoners, while other state captives were held in the Grand Châtelet. Its use as a prison declined after the completion of the Bastille in the 1370s, but was not ended: for example, Antoine de Chabannes was held at the Louvre in 1462–1463, John II, Duke of Alençon in 1474–1476, and Leonora Dori in 1617 upon the assassination of her husband Concino Concini at the Louvre's entrance following Louis XIII's orders.

=== Treasury ===
Under Philip II and his immediate successors, the royal treasure was kept in the Paris precinct of the Knights Templar, located at the present-day Square du Temple. King Philip IV created a second treasury at the Louvre, whose first documented evidence dates from 1296. Following the suppression of the Templars' Order by the same Philip IV in the early 14th century, the Louvre became the sole location of the king's treasury in Paris, which remained there in various forms until the late 17th century. In the 16th century, following the reorganization into the Trésor de l'Épargne in 1523, it was kept in one of the remaining medieval towers of the Louvre Castle, with a dedicated guard.

=== Place of worship ===
By contrast to the Palais de la Cité with its soaring Sainte-Chapelle, the religious function was never particularly prominent at the Louvre. The royal household used the nearby Saint-Germain l'Auxerrois as their parish church. A chapel of modest size was built by Louis IX in the 1230s in the western wing, whose footprint remains in the southern portion of the Lescot Wing's lower main room. In the 1580s, King Henry III projected to build a large chapel and then a convent in the space between the Louvre and the Seine, but only managed to demolish some of the existing structures on that spot.

At the time when Louis XIV resided at the Louvre, a new chapel was established on the first floor of the Pavillon de l'Horloge and consecrated on 18 February 1659 as Our Lady of Peace and of Saint Louis, the reference to peace being made in the context of negotiation with Spain that resulted later that year in the Treaty of the Pyrenees. This room was of double height, including what is now the pavilion's second floor (or attic). In 1915, the Louvre's architect Victor-Auguste Blavette considered restoring that volume to its original height of more than 12 meters, but did not complete that plan.

On 2 April 1810, Percier and Fontaine had the Salon Carré temporarily redecorated and converted into a chapel for the wedding of Napoleon and Marie Louise of Austria. Meanwhile, in planning the Louvre's expansion and reunion with the Tuileries, Napoleon insisted that a major church should be part of the complex. In 1810 Percier and Fontaine made plans to build it on the northern side of the present-day Cour Napoléon. Its entrance would have been through a new protruding structure now known as the Rotonde de Beauvais, facing the symmetrical entrance of the Louvre museum on the southern side in the Rotonde d'Apolon. The church was to be dedicated to Saint Napoleon, a hitherto obscure figure promoted by Napoleon as patron saint of his incipient dynasty (Napoleon also instituted a national holiday on his birthday on 15 August and called it the Saint-Napoléon). It was intended to "equal in greatness and magnificence that of the Château de Versailles" (i.e. the Palace Chapel). Percier and Fontaine initiated work on the Rotonde de Beauvais, which was completed during Napoleon III's Louvre expansion, but the construction of the main church building was never started.

=== Home of national representation ===
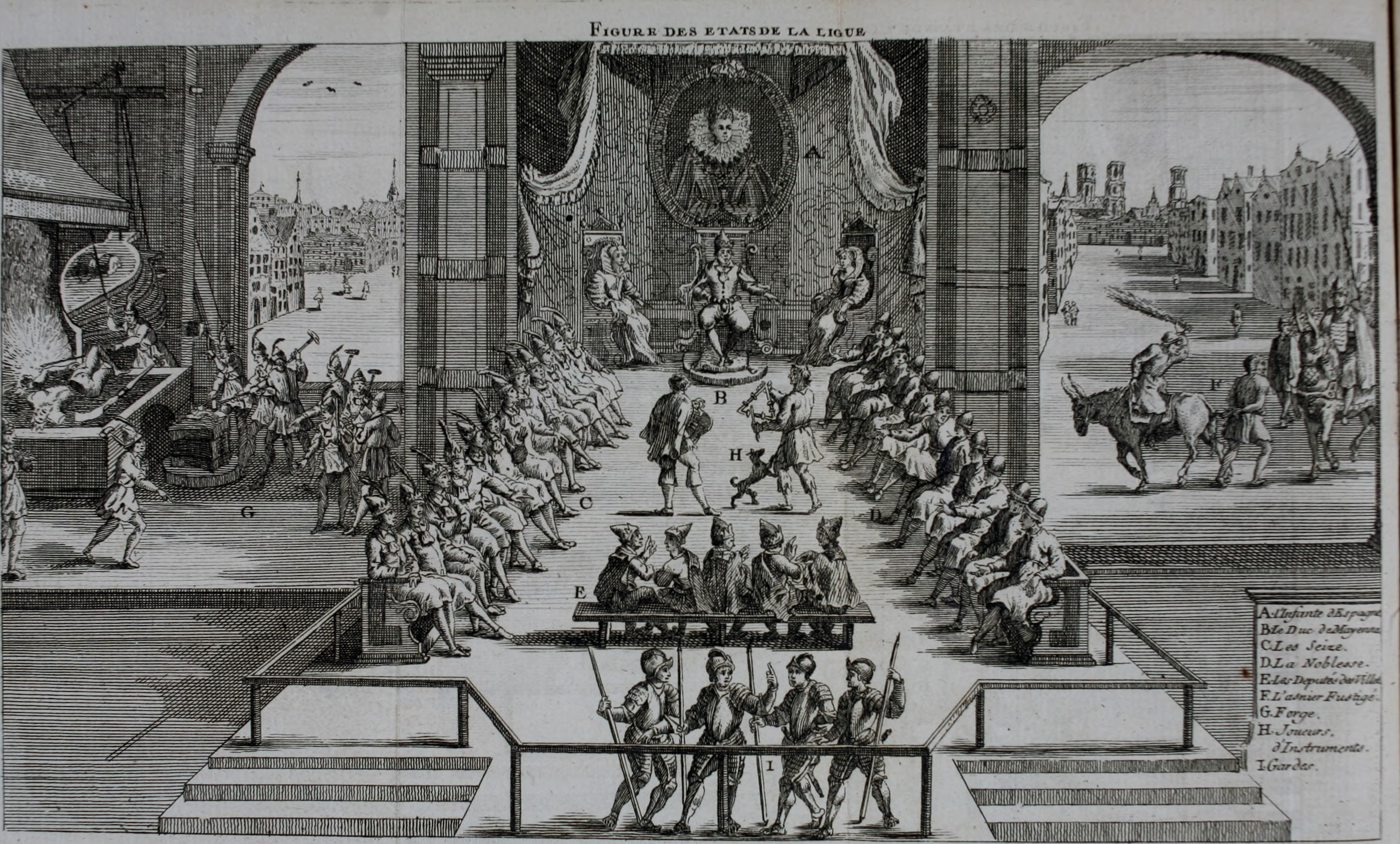
Satirical representation of the 1593 Estates General meeting in the Lescot Wing's first-floor main room (since 2021 the salle étrusque), from the Satire Ménippée

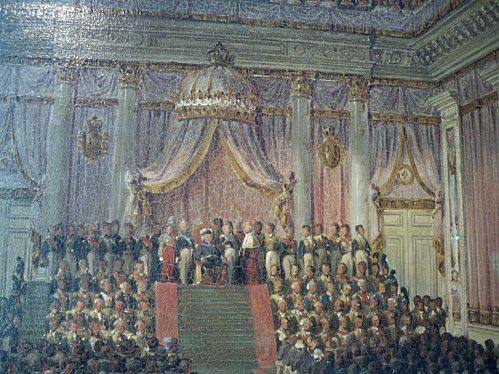
Opening of the annual legislative session by Louis XVIII on 28 January 1823, in the same room restored by Percier and Fontaine

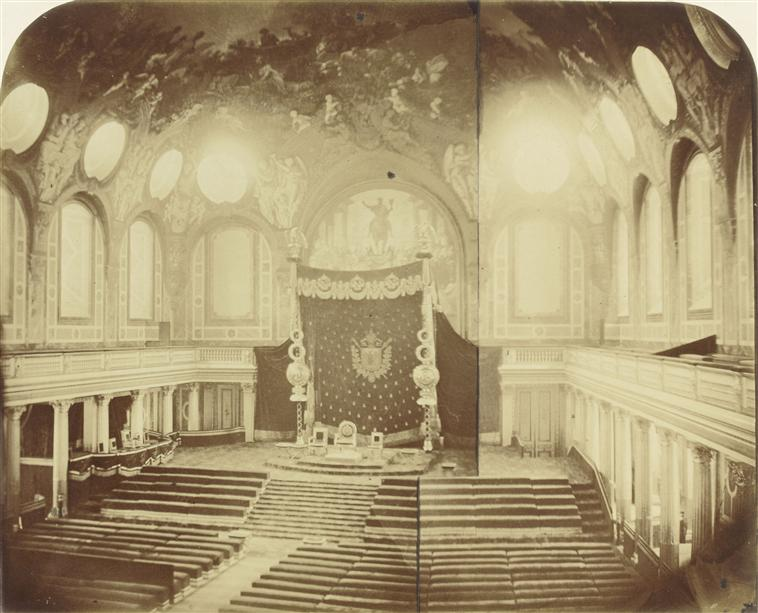
Napoleon III's salle des Etats in the newly built Denon Wing, anonymous photograph ca. 1860

In 1303, the Louvre was the venue of the second-ever meeting of France's Estates General, in the wake of the first meeting held the previous year at Notre-Dame de Paris. The meeting was held in the Grande Salle on the ground floor of the castle's western wing. In 1593, another session of the Estates General was held in the Louvre, one floor up compared with 1303 following reconstruction as the Lescot Wing. That session, however, was without the presence of King Henry IV and organized by the Catholic League with a view to replacing him. The next session of the Estates General in 1614–1615 was held in the larger room of the Hôtel du Petit-Bourbon, in effect a contiguous dependency of the Louvre at that time.

During the Bourbon Restoration, the same first-floor room that had been used for the 1593 meeting, recreated by Percier and Fontaine as the Salle des Séances, was used for the yearly ceremonial opening of the legislative session, which was attended by the king in person – even though ordinary sessions were held in other buildings, namely the Palais Bourbon for the Chamber of Deputies and the Luxembourg Palace for the Chamber of Peers. During the July Monarchy, the yearly opening session was located at the Palais Bourbon, but it was brought back to the Louvre under the Second Empire. From 1857 onwards, the new Salle des États in the South (Denon) Wing of Napoleon III's Louvre expansion was used for that purpose. In the 1860s Napoleon III and Lefuel planned a new venue to replace the Salle des Etats in the newly purpose-built Pavillon des Sessions, but it was not yet ready for use at the time of the Empire's fall in September 1870.

That role of the Louvre disappeared following the end of the French monarchy in 1870. As a legacy of the temporary relocation of both assemblies in the Palace of Versailles in the 1870s, their joint sessions have been held there ever since, in a room that was purpose-built for that use (salle des séances) and completed in 1875 in the Versailles palace's South Wing.

=== Royal residence ===
For centuries, the seat of executive power in Paris had been established at the Palais de la Cité, at or near the spot where Julian had been proclaimed Roman Emperor back in 360 CE. The political turmoil that followed the death of Philip IV, however, led to the emergence of rival centers of power in and around Paris, of which the Louvre was one. In 1316 Clementia of Hungary, the widow of recently deceased king Louis X, spent much of her pregnancy at the Château de Vincennes but resided at the Louvre when she gave birth to baby King John I on 15 November 1316, who died five days later. John was thus both the only king of France born at the Louvre, and almost certainly the only one who died there (Henry IV is now generally believed to have died before his carriage arrived at the Louvre following his fatal stabbing in the rue de la Ferronnerie on 14 May 1610). Philip VI occasionally resided at the Louvre, as documented by some of his letters in mid-1328. King John II is also likely to have resided at the Louvre in 1347, since his daughter Joan of Valois was betrothed there to Henry of Brabant on 21 June 1347, and his short-lived daughter Marguerite was born at the Louvre on 20 September 1347.

Charles V of France, who had survived the invasion of the Cité by Étienne Marcel's partisans in 1358, decided that a less central location would be preferable for his safety. In 1360 he initiated the construction of the Hôtel Saint-Pol, which became his main place of residence in Paris. Upon becoming king in 1364, he started transforming the Louvre into a permanent and more majestic royal residence, even though he stayed there less often than at the Hôtel Saint-Pol. After Charles V's death, his successor Charles VI also mainly stayed at the Hôtel Saint-Pol, but as he was incapacitated by mental illness, his wife Isabeau of Bavaria resided in the Louvre and ruled from there.

Later 15th-century kings did not reside in the Louvre, nor did either Francis I or Henry II even as they partly converted the Louvre as a Renaissance palace. The royal family only came back to reside in the newly rebuilt complex following Catherine de' Medici's abandonment of the Hôtel des Tournelles after her husband Henry II's traumatic death there in July 1559. From then, the king and court would stay mainly in the Louvre between 1559 and 1588 when Henry III escaped Paris, then between 1594 and 1610 under Henry IV. Beyond his minority, Louis XIII did not much reside in the Louvre and preferred the suburban residences of Saint-Germain-en-Laye (where Louis XIV was born on 5 September 1638, and where Louis XIII himself died on 14 May 1643) and Fontainebleau (where Louis XIII had been born on 27 September 1601). Louis XIV stayed away from the Louvre during the Fronde between 1643 and 1652, and departed from there following the death of his mother in 1666. Louis XV only briefly resided in the Louvre's Appartement d'été d'Anne d'Autriche in 1719, as the Tuileries were undergoing refurbishment.

Both Louis XIV in the 1660s and Napoleon in the 1810s made plans to establish their main residence in the Colonnade Wing, but none of these respective projects came to fruition. Napoleon's attempt led to Percier and Fontaine's creation of the two monumental staircase on both ends of the wing, but was abandoned in February 1812.

=== Library ===
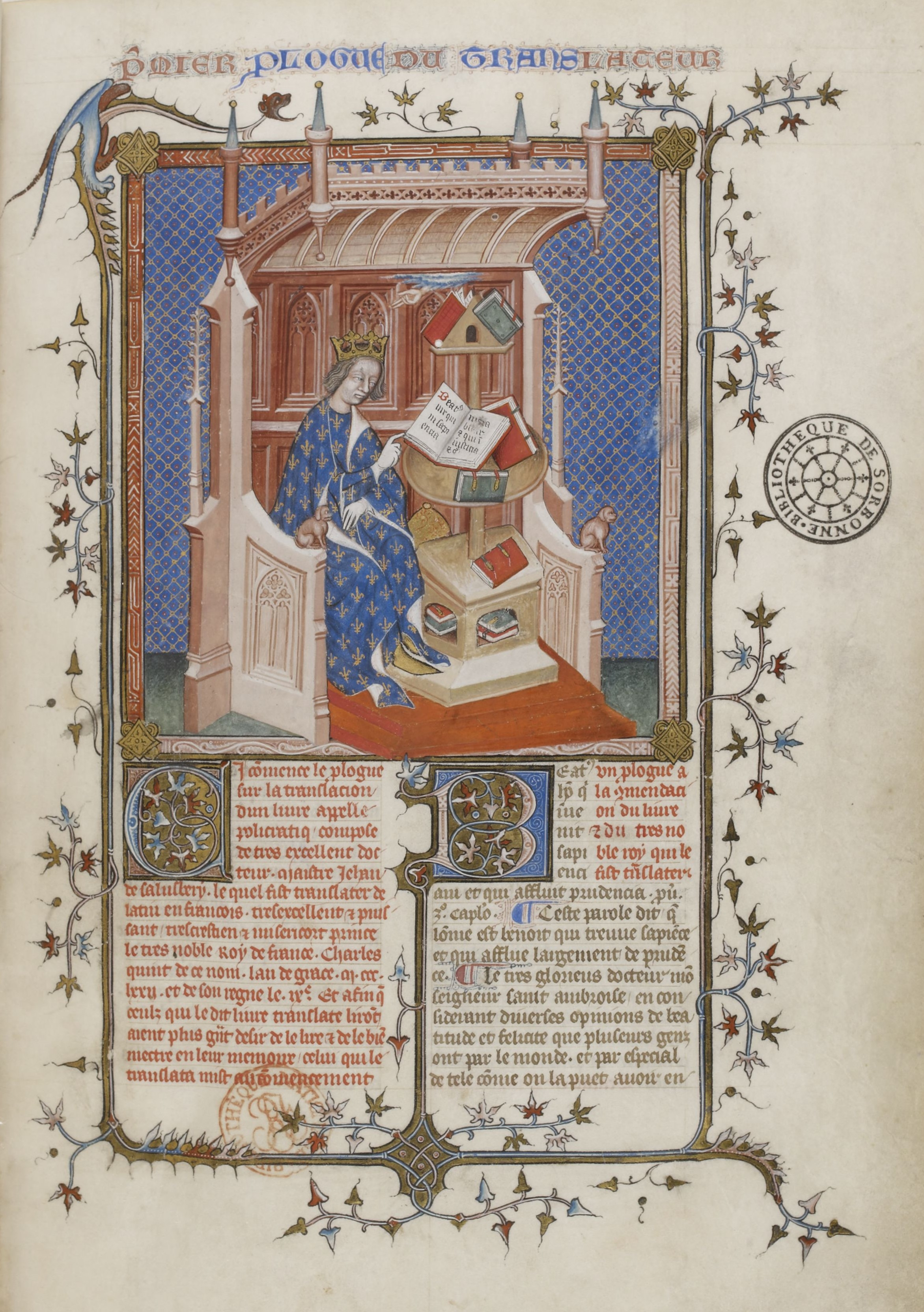
Charles V pictured with a precious book, miniature of John of Salisbury's Policraticus, 1372

Charles V was renowned for his interest in books (thus his moniker "le sage" which translates as "learned" as well as "wise"), and in 1368 established a library of about 900 volumes on three levels inside the northwestern tower of the Louvre, then renamed from Tour de la Fauconnerie to Tour de la Librairie. The next year he appointed Gilles Mallet, one of his officials, as the librarian. This action has been widely viewed as foundational, transitioning from the kings' prior practice of keeping books as individual objects to organizing a collection with proper cataloguing; as such, Charles V's library is generally considered a precursor to the French National Library, even though it was dismantled in the 15th century.

In 1767, a project to relocate the Royal Library from its site on rue de Richelieu into the Louvre was presented by Jacques-Germain Soufflot, endorsed by Superintendent de Marigny and approved by Louis XV, but remained stillborn for lack of funds. A similar project was endorsed by Napoleon from February 1805, for which Percier and Fontaine planned a new Library wing as the centerpiece of their program to fill the space between Louvre and Tuileries, but it was not implemented either.

A separate and smaller Bibliothèque du Louvre was formed from book collections seized during the Revolution and grew during the 19th century's successive regimes. Initially located in the Tuileries in 1800, it was moved to the Grande Galerie's entresol in 1805. In 1860 it was moved to a new space created by Lefuel on the second floor of the new North (Richelieu) Wing of Napoleon III's Louvre expansion, whose main pavilion on the rue de Rivoli was accordingly named Pavillon de la Bibliothèque. The new library was served by an elegant staircase, now Escalier Lefuel, and was decorated by François Victor Eloi Biennourry and Alexandre-Dominique Denuelle. It was destroyed by arson in May 1871 at the same time as the Tuileries, and only a few of its precious holdings could be saved.

Yet another library, the Bibliothèque Centrale des Musées Nationaux (BCMN), was gradually developed by the curators, mainly during the 20th century, and located on half of the attic of the Cour Carrée's southern wing, on the river-facing side. The transfer of its collections to the new Institut National d'Histoire de l'Art was planned in the 1990s and executed in early 2016 after much delay. Several smaller libraries remain in the Louvre: a Centre Dominique-Vivant Denon in the BCMN's former spaces, open to the public; a specialized scholarly library on art of the eastern Mediterranean and the Middle East, located on the Cour Lefuel and thus known as the Bibliothèque Lefuel; and two other specialized libraries, respectively on painting in the Aile de Flore and decorative arts in the Aile de Rohan.

=== Ceremonial venue ===
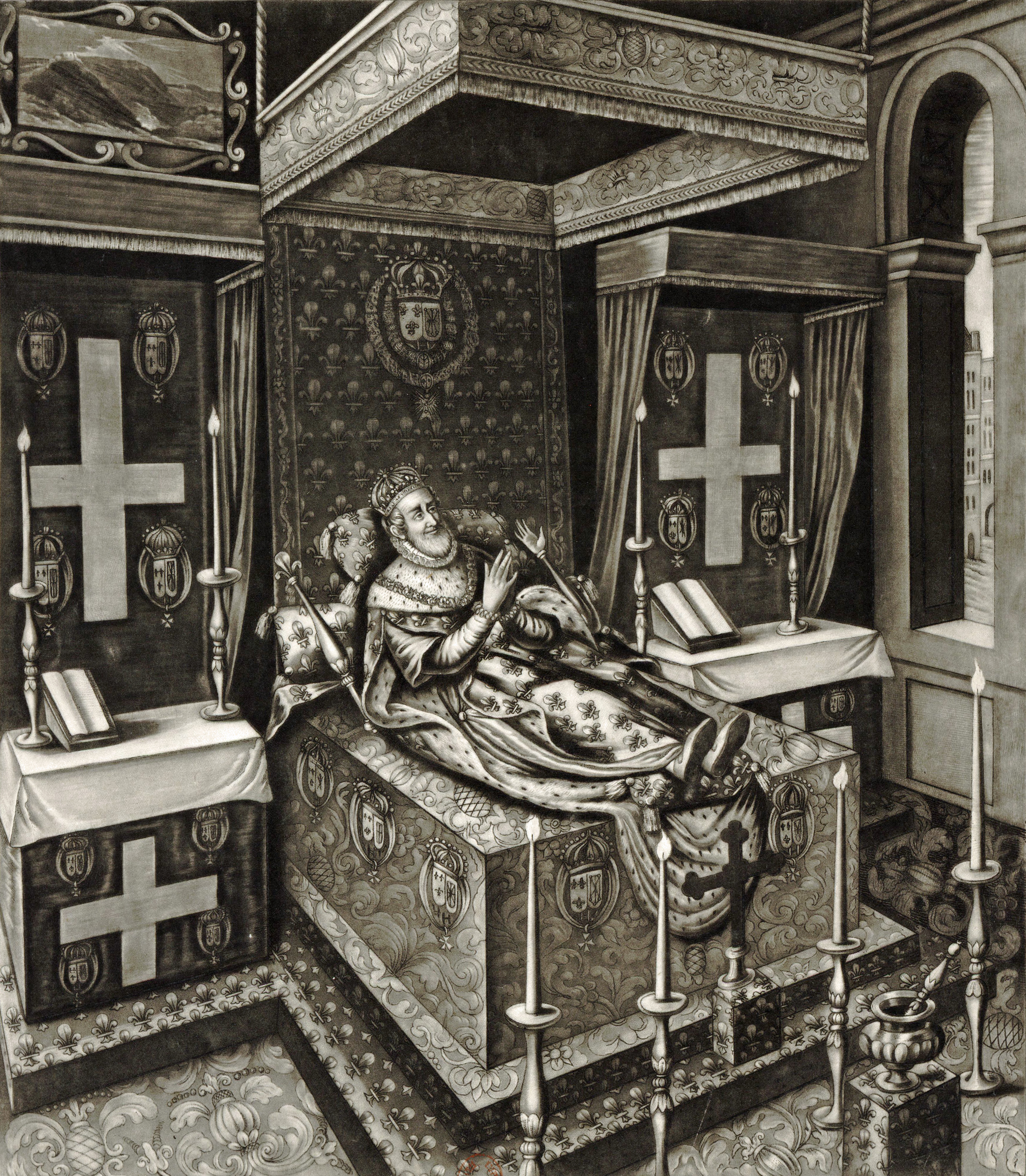
Wax effigy of Henry IV displayed in the Louvre's lower main room on 10–21 June 1610, engraving after a painting by François Quesnel

On the occasion of Charles IV, Holy Roman Emperor's visit to Paris in 1377–1378, the main banquet was held at the Palais de la Cité but the French king used the Louvre's Grande Salle on the next day to give a major speech on his political position in the conflict now known as the Hundred Years' War. The medieval Louvre's western wing was where the ceremonial spaces were located, and that geography did not change with the 16th century's reconstruction as Lescot Wing. Following the latter, most major functions were held either on the lower main room now known as Salle des Caryatides, or in the upper main room then known under various names (see above) and now as the Salle Etrusque.

A number of betrothals and weddings were concluded and celebrated at the Louvre. These included the betrothal of Henry of Brabant and Joan of Valois on 21 June 1347, the weddings of Charles of Orléans and Isabella of Valois on 9 November 1389, of John of Brittany and Joan of France on 30 July 1397, of Charles of France and Marie of Anjou on 18 December 1413, of Francis of Nevers and Marguerite of Bourbon-La Marche on 19 January 1538, of Francis of France and Mary Stuart on 19 April 1558, of Charles III, Duke of Lorraine and Claude of France on 19 January 1559; the betrothal of Philip II of Spain and Elisabeth of Valois on 20 June 1559; the weddings of Henry of Navarre and Margaret of Valois on 19 August 1572, of François de Bourbon and Jeanne de Coesme on 17 December 1582, of Louis, Grand Condé and Claire-Clémence de Maillé on 7 February 1641, of Charles Amadeus of Savoy and Élisabeth de Bourbon on 11 July 1643, of Armand de Bourbon and Anne Marie Martinozzi on 21 February 1654, and of Henri Jules of Condé and Anne Henriette of Bavaria on 11 December 1663. Another grimmer occasion was just after the assassination of King Henry IV, when the King's coffin was put to lay in state in the Salle des Caryatides of the Lescot Wing.

One of the more recent ceremonial gatherings in the Louvre was a candlelit dinner given in the Salle des Caryatides on 10 April 1957 in honor of Queen Elizabeth II and Prince Philip, Duke of Edinburgh, hosted by French President René Coty at the end of their weeklong visit in Paris. An after-dinner reception was then given in the appartement d'été d'Anne d'Autriche. A few years later, minister André Malraux started a tradition of public ceremonies in the Cour Carrée to celebrate recently deceased French cultural luminaries. These were held in honor of Georges Braque on 3 September 1963 and Le Corbusier on 1 September 1965, with Malraux delivering the eulogy; of Malraux himself on 27 November 1976, with eulogy by prime minister Raymond Barre; and of Pierre Soulages on 2 November 2022, with eulogy by president Emmanuel Macron.

=== Guest residence for foreign sovereigns and royals ===
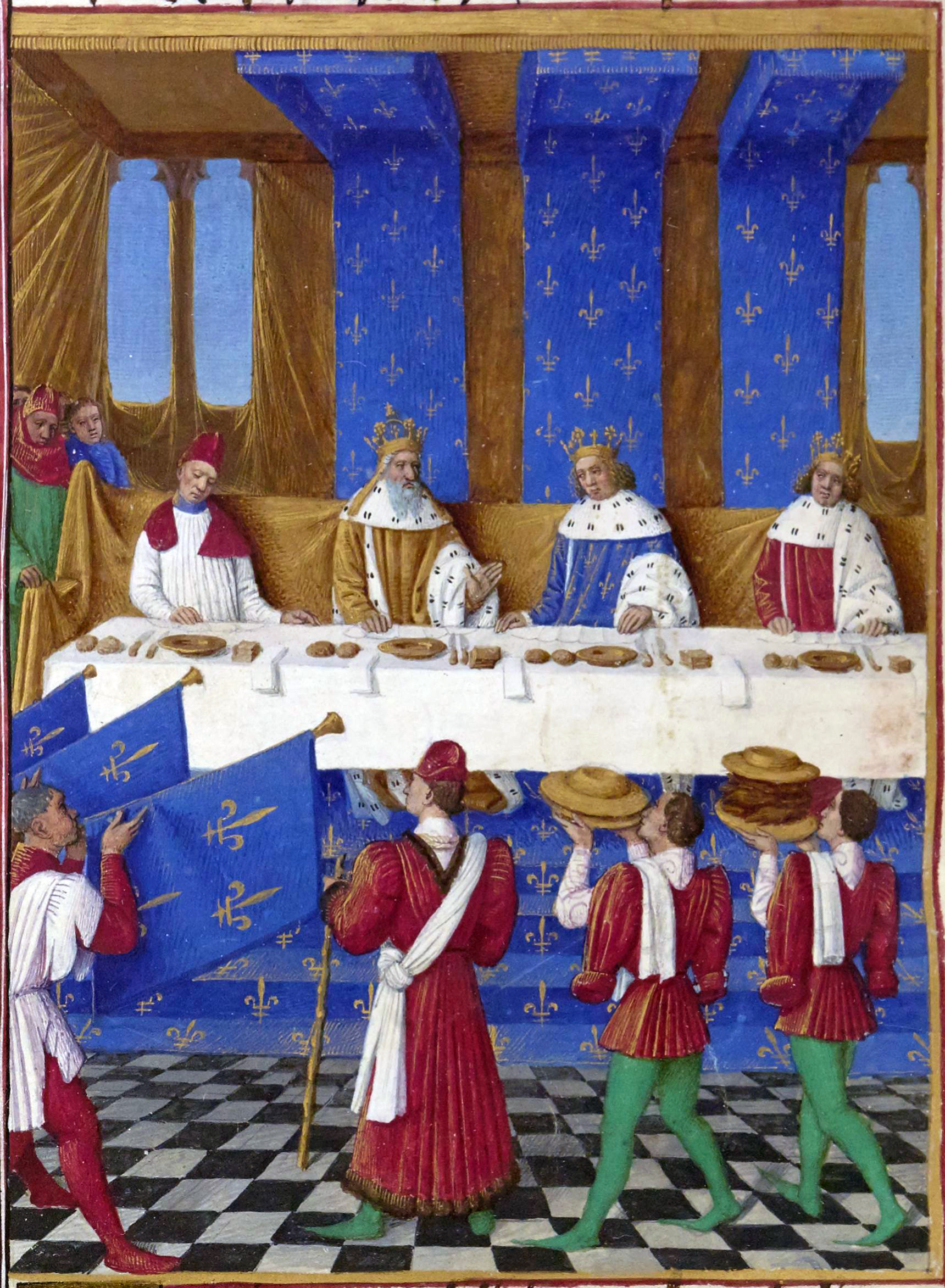
King Charles V (center right) hosting Emperor Charles IV (center left) in Paris in early 1378. Both monarchs stayed at the Louvre after the banquet depicted here

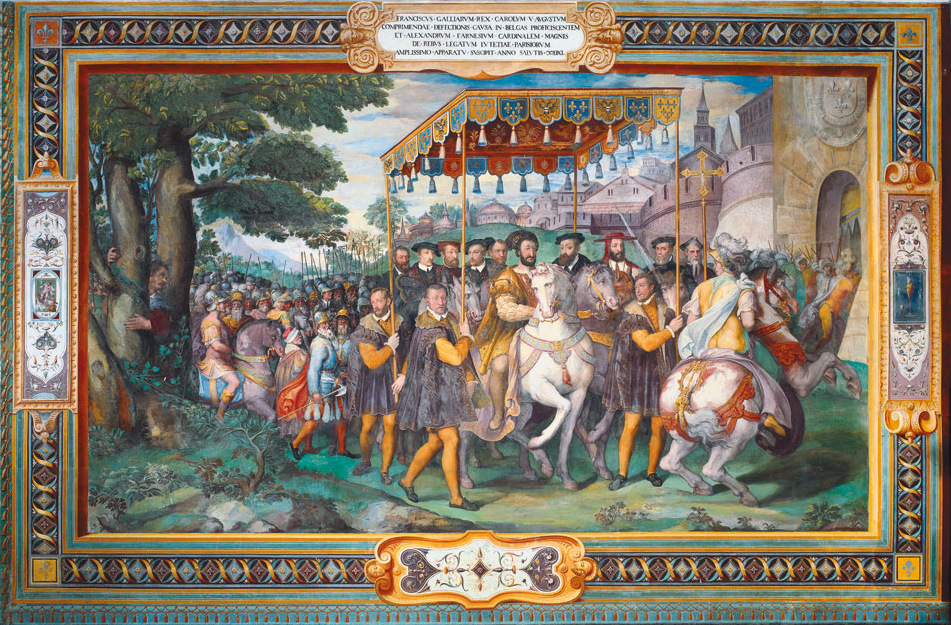
King Francis I and Emperor Charles V enter Paris together on 1 January 1540, fresco by Taddeo Zuccari, Villa Farnese. Charles spent his first Parisian night at the Palais de la Cité and the following five at the Louvre, spruced up for the occasion

The Louvre was the Parisian accommodation of the Emperors who came to visit France: Charles IV, Holy Roman Emperor stayed there in early 1378; Byzantine Emperor Manuel II Palaiologos from June 1400 to November 1402, using it as his base for several trips across Europe; Sigismund, Holy Roman Emperor in March and April 1416; and Charles V, Holy Roman Emperor on 2–7 January 1540.

In the late 1640s as the royal family had temporarily left the Louvre, Queen Henrietta Maria of England spent some of her Parisian exile in the apartment of the Queen Mother, on the ground floor of the southern wing of the Cour Carrée, where in early February 1649 she learned about the execution of her husband Charles I.

In 1717, the Appartement d'été d'Anne d'Autriche was made available to Peter the Great during his visit in Paris, but the Tsar preferred to stay in the less grandiose Hôtel de Lesdiguières. In 1722, the same apartment became the temporary residence of Infanta Mariana Victoria of Spain, who was promised to marry the young Louis XV (she then moved to Versailles, and in 1725 returned to Spain following the cancelation of the marriage project). This episode remains in the name of the garden in front of the Petite Galerie, known since as the Jardin de l'Infante. The courtyard on the other side of the wing, previously known as Cour de la Reine, was also known as the Cour de l'Infante for much of the 18th century (and later Cour du Musée, now Cour du Sphinx).

In the 1860s, Napoleon III decided to create a prestige apartment for visiting sovereigns in the Aile de Flore, close to his own apartment in the Tuileries Palace. Lefuel designed it with a monumental escalier des Souverains, the decoration of which he led between 1873 and 1878 even though the monarchy had fallen in the meantime. That project, however, was left unfinished, and in 1901–1902 its richly decorated upper section was repurposed into a room which is now the study gallery of the Louvre's department of graphical arts.

=== Court house ===
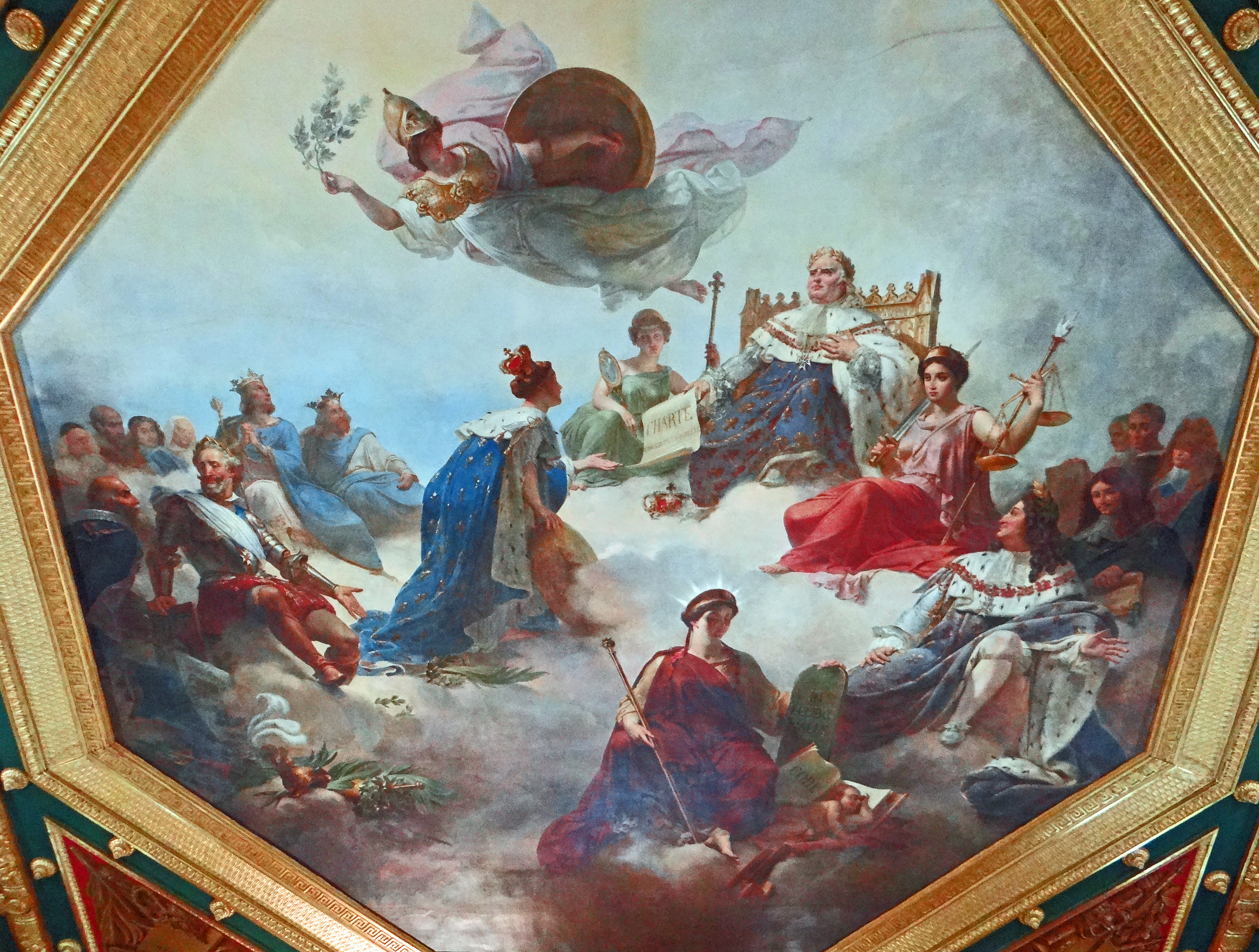
Louis XVIII granting the Charter of 1814 to grateful France, 1827 painting by Merry-Joseph Blondel in the Salle des Séances du Conseil d'Etat, Lemercier Wing

The Louvre has traditionally not had much of a judiciary role, since royal justice was strongly associated with the much older Palais de la Cité, and local judicial functions under the Prévôt de Paris, including torture and incarceration, were mainly located at the Grand Châtelet. In 1505, as the Châtelet underwent renovation works, its judicial functions were temporarily hosted in the Louvre. Given the castle's prestige it was deemed unsuitable for torture, which was instead carried out during that period in the Petit Châtelet.

Under Henry IV, the Parlement of Paris was summoned by the king to hold sessions at the Louvre rather than at its traditional venue of the Palais de la Cité.

The Louvre again hosted a judiciary institution when the Conseil d'État was located there between 1824 and 1832. It was awarded the first floor of the Lemercier Wing On the western side of the Cour Carrée, and remained there until 1832. The painted ceilings of that era, installed in 1827, are still preserved with allegorical themes related to French history and legislation.

The space to the south of the Lescot Wing's Lower Great Hall (now Salle des Caryatides), created by Pierre Lescot in phases between 1546 and the late 1550s and later remodeled, is known as the tribunal. This word, however, refers to its architectural setting, providing a monumental stand for the royal family to watch and dominate the functions held in the Great Hall, and not to a judicial role.

=== Execution site ===
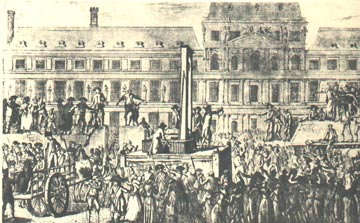
First execution with guillotine at Place du Caroussel, August 1792

The Louvre was the scene of capital punishment on various occasions. On 4 December 1591, Charles de Guise had four members of the 16-member Conseil des Seize hung from the ceiling of the Lescot Wing's lower main room, now the Salle des Caryatides. During the French Revolution between 21 August 1792 and 11 May 1793, the guillotine was installed on the Place du Carrousel in front of the Tuileries Palace. It was relocated to the Place de la Concorde (then known as Place de la Révolution), first on a one-off basis for the execution of Louis XVI on 21 January 1793, and then permanently in May of the same year.

=== Entertainment venue ===
Entertainment performances such as tournaments, games, balls and theater were a core part of court life at the time when the Louvre was a royal residence. On the night of 5 February 1606, a torch-lit carrousel was performed in the Louvre's courtyard between midnight and 5 am, with the monarchs and courtiers watching from their apartments' windows. In 1610, a gladiator-style fight between a man and a lion was organized in the courtyard, which King Henry IV also watched from inside the building. In February 1625 and 1626 respectively, two major ballets burlesques directed by Daniel Rabel were performed in the Louvre's Lower Great Room (now Salle des Caryatides), with Louis XIII himself appearing as one of the dancers.

Theatrical representations were particularly significant in the period following the return of the court to the Louvre in 1652. Molière first performed in front of the king in the large first-floor room of the Lescot Wing on 24 October 1658, playing his Nicomède and Le Dépit amoureux. Following that performance's success, he was granted use of a space first in the Hôtel du Petit-Bourbon and then, after the latter's demolition to make space for the Louvre Colonnade, at the Palais-Royal. Molière again performed at the Louvre on 29 January 1664 when he directed Le Mariage forcé, with Louis XIV himself playing a cameo role as an Egyptian, in the main room of the Queen Mother on the ground floor of the Cour Carrée's southern wing. On 17 November 1667, Jean Racine's Andromaque was created at the Louvre in Louis XIV's presence.

Some lavish entertainment performances left such a mark on collective memory that parts of the Louvre came to be named after them. Thus, the Place du Carrousel preserves the memory of the Grand Carrousel of 5–6 June 1662, and the Pavillon de Flore is named after the Ballet de Flore that was first performed there on 13 February 1669.

Napoleon decided to build a new venue for the Paris Opera as part of his project to complete the Louvre and its reunion with the Tuileries. In 1810 Percier and Fontaine planned a new opera house north of what is now the Cour Napoléon, on a similar footprint to the present-day Passage Richelieu, with main entrance on the northern side facing the Palais-Royal. That project, however, was not implemented. Nor was Napoleon III's plan in the 1860s to build a large theater room in the Aile de Marsan as a symmetrical counterpart to the Pavillon des Sessions he created in the southern Aile de Flore.

In the 1960s, a theater appears to have operated in the Pavillon de Marsan, known as the Théâtre du Pavillon de Marsan. Samuel Beckett's play named Play (French: Comédie) had its French premiere there on 11 June 1964, directed by Jean-Marie Serreau.

In 1996, the Comédie-Française opened the Studio-Théâtre in the underground spaces of the Carrousel du Louvre, its third venue (after its main Palais-Royal facility and the Théâtre du Vieux-Colombier).

=== Residence of artists and craftsmen ===
On 22 December 1608, Henry IV published letters patent heralding his decision to invite hundreds of artists and craftsmen to live and work on the floors under the Grande Galerie. Simultaneously, Henry established a tapestry factory there, which remained until its transfer to the Gobelins Manufactory in 1671. Creators who lived under the Grande Galerie in the 17th and 18th centuries included Louis Le Vau, Théophraste Renaudot from 1648 to 1653, André Charles Boulle, Jean-Baptiste Pigalle, Augustin Pajou, Maurice Quentin de La Tour, Claude-Joseph Vernet, Carle Vernet, Horace Vernet (who was born there), Jean-Baptiste Greuze, Jean-Honoré Fragonard, and Hubert Robert.

Following the departure of the royal court to Versailles in the 1670s, a number of individuals, many of which were artists, obtained the privilege to establish their residence in parts of the formerly royal palace. These included Jacques-Louis David in the southeastern corner of the Cour Carrée and Charles-André van Loo in the Galerie d'Apollon. On 20 August 1801, Napoleon had the artists and others who lived in the Cour Carrée all expelled, and in 1806 put a final end to the creators' lodgings under the Grande Galerie.

=== Royal mint ===
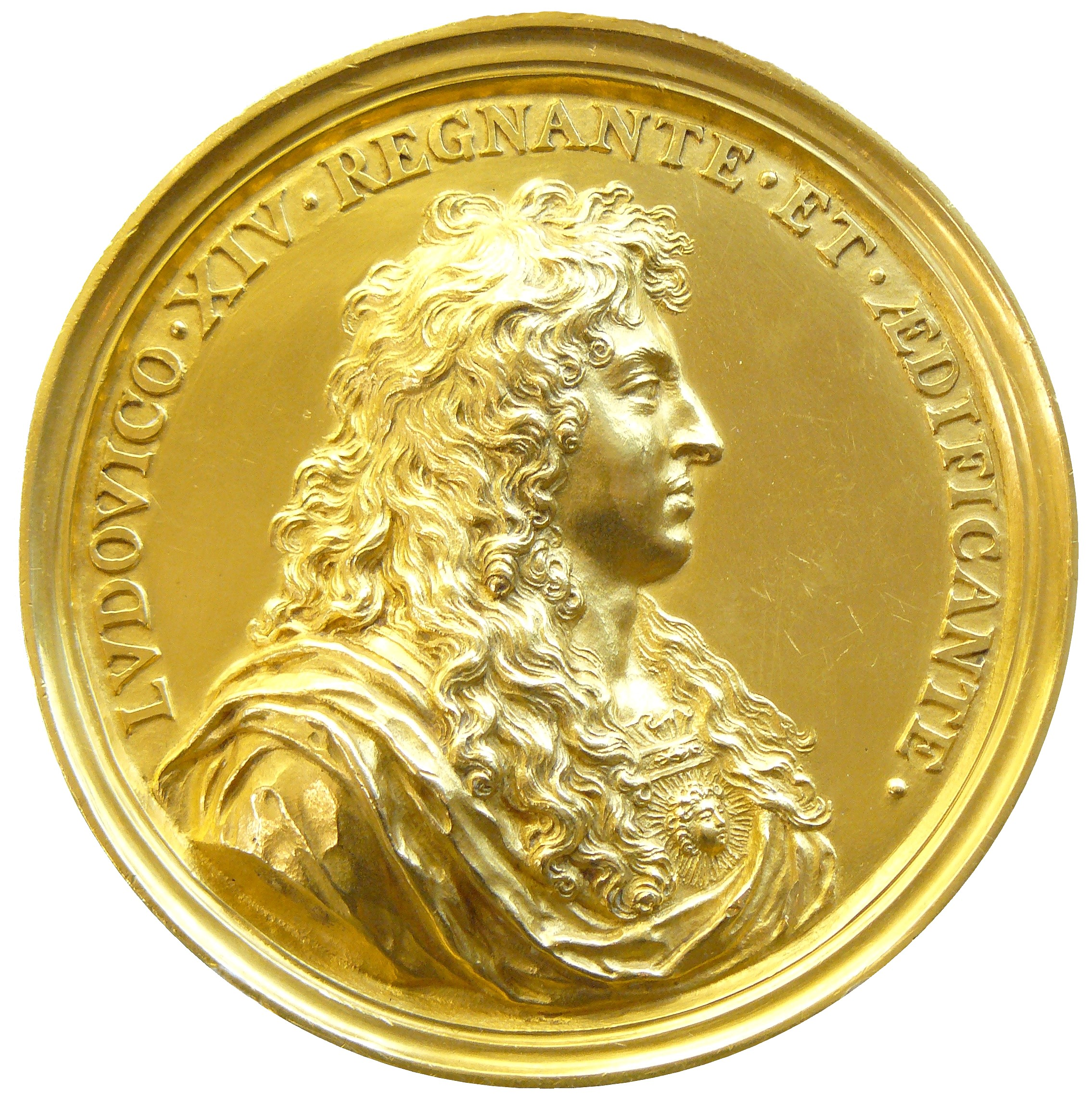
Medal of Louis XIV by Jean Varin (1666), made at the Louvre mint

In July 1609, Henry IV transferred the mint to a space the Grande Galerie, from its previous location on the Île de la Cité. The Louvre mint specialized in the production of medals, tokens and commemorative coins, and was correspondingly known as the monnaie des médailles, whereas common coin kept being produced at the monnaie des espèces on rue de la Monnaie behind Saint-Germain l'Auxerrois as had been the case since the 13th century.

The Louvre's medals mint was led by prominent artists that included Guillaume Dupré, Jean Varin, and Claude Ballin. It closed during the French Revolution but was revived in 1804 by Vivant Denon. By imperial decree of 5 March 1806, it was relocated from the Louvre to the Hôtel des Monnaies where the monnaie des espèces had moved in 1775.

=== Residence of senior courtiers and officials ===
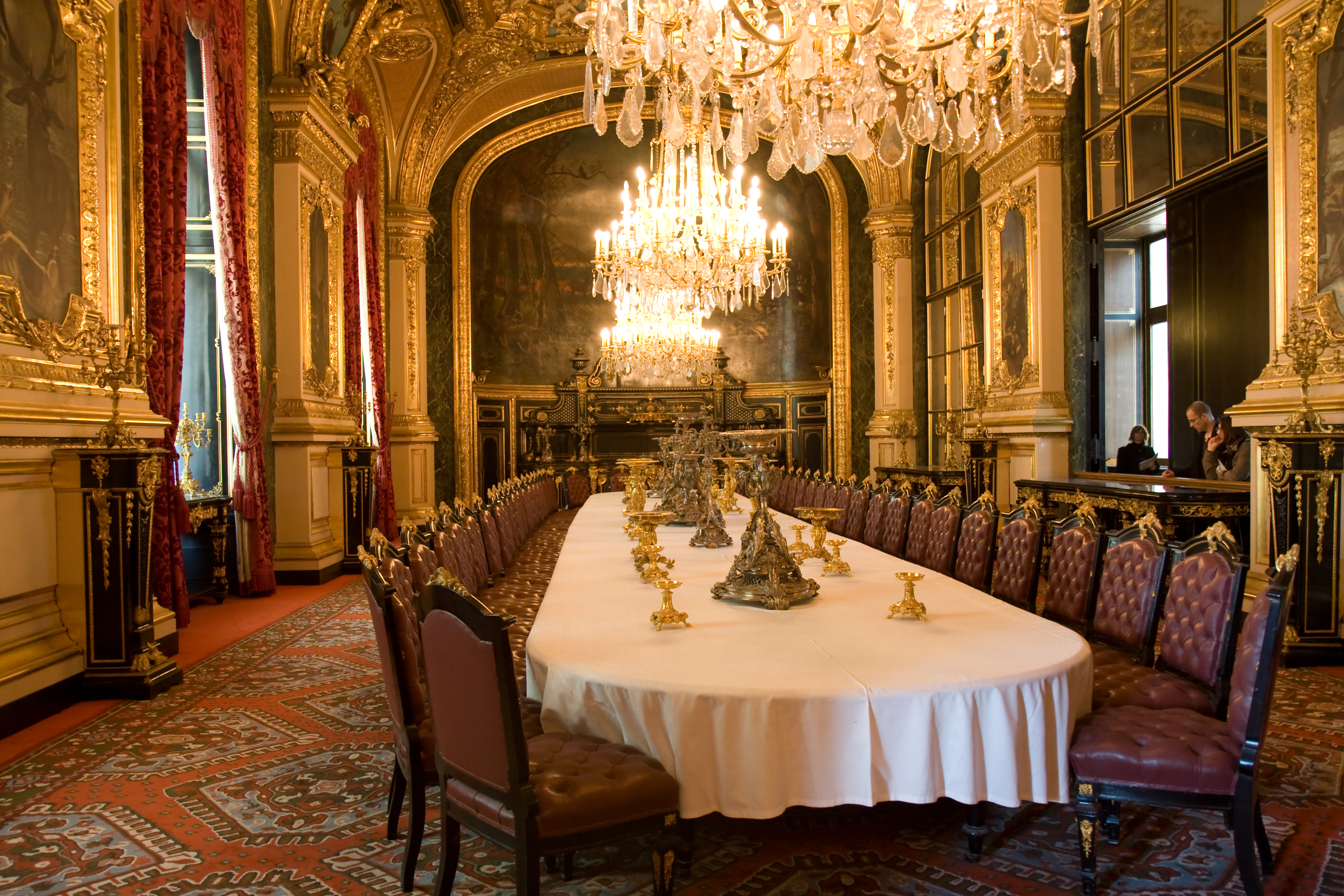
Dining room of the Appartement Napoleon III

In the 17th century, the second floor of the Pavillon du Roi was the home of Charles d'Albert, duc de Luynes until 1621, then of Gaston, Duke of Orléans, and from 1652 of Cardinal Mazarin who also established his nieces in the second-floor attic of the Lescot Wing.. Nicolas Fouquet and his successor Jean-Baptiste Colbert similarly lived on the upper floors of the Pavillon du Roi, above the King's bedchamber.

New prestige apartments for regime dignitaries were created as part of Napoleon III's Louvre expansion. The main one, in the North (Richelieu) Wing, became the apartment of the Finance Minister after 1871, and as such featured prominently in Raymond Depardon's documentary 1974, une partie de campagne, shot during the presidential election campaign of then minister Valéry Giscard d'Estaing in early 1974. The apartment was renovated in the early 1990s and is now a part of the Louvre's decorative arts department, known as Appartement Napoléon III. Another official apartment was created for the imperial "Great Equerry" (grand écuyer) Émile Félix Fleury, in the South (Denon) Wing, with entrance through an ornate portico in the Cour Lefuel. Part of that large apartment was converted in the 1990s into the museum's exhibition space for northern European sculpture, while another part has been used since 1912 as offices for the Louvre's director and their staff. Lefuel also created two successive apartments for the Louvre's director Émilien de Nieuwerkerke, the first in former rooms of the Académie de peinture, and when these had to be demolished to build the Escalier Daru, on the first floor of the Cour Carrée's northern wing.

Several tied cottages still exist in the Pavillon de Flore, including one for the museum's Director. Other apartments in the same pavilion are reserved for senior personnel tasked with the museum's security and maintenance, so that they stay close in case their presence is needed for an emergency.

=== National printing house ===
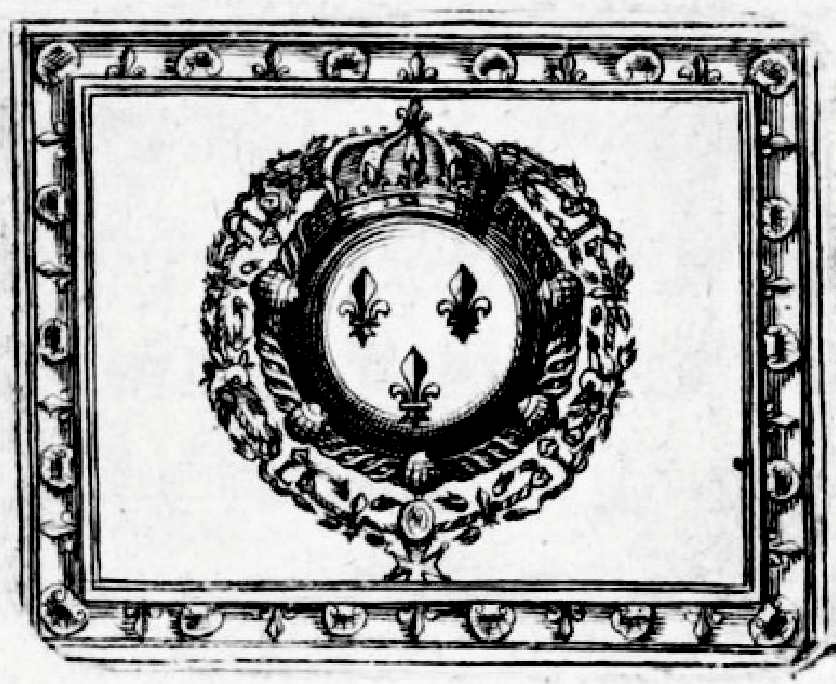
Stamp of the Royal Printing House located at the Louvre, 1677

A first printing workshop appeared in the Louvre in the 1620s. In 1640, superintendent François Sublet de Noyers established it as a royal printing house, the Imprimerie du Louvre, putting an end to the monarchy's prior practice of subcontracting its printing tasks to individual entrepreneurs such as Robert Estienne. The royal printing house, soon known as Imprimerie Royale, was first led by Sébastien Cramoisy and his descendants, then by members of the Anisson-Duperron family throughout the 18th century until 1792. It was relocated to the Hôtel de Toulouse in 1795, then the Hôtel de Rohan in 1809.

In the early 1850s in the early stages of Napoleon III's Louvre expansion, projects were made to relocate the national printing house (then known as Imprimerie Impériale) in the new building of the Louvre, now the Richelieu Wing. These plans were criticized by Ludovic Vitet among others, and were not implemented.

=== Academic and educational facility ===
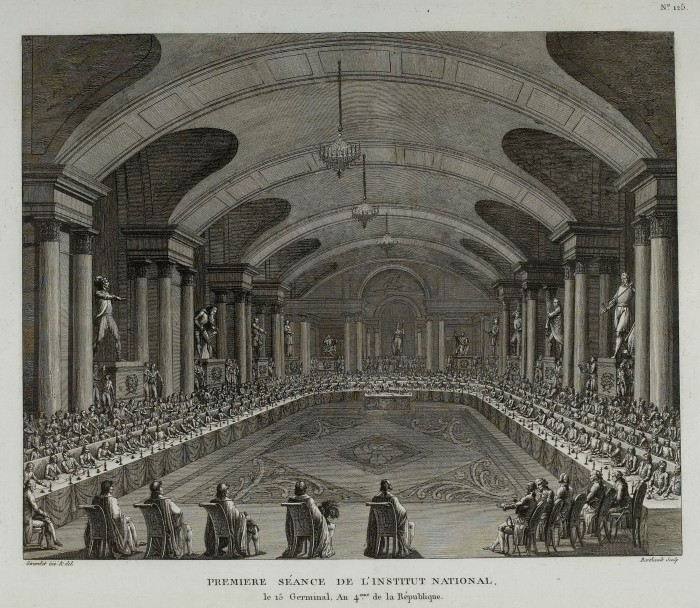
Inaugural session of the Institut de France in the Salle des Caryatides, 24 October 1795

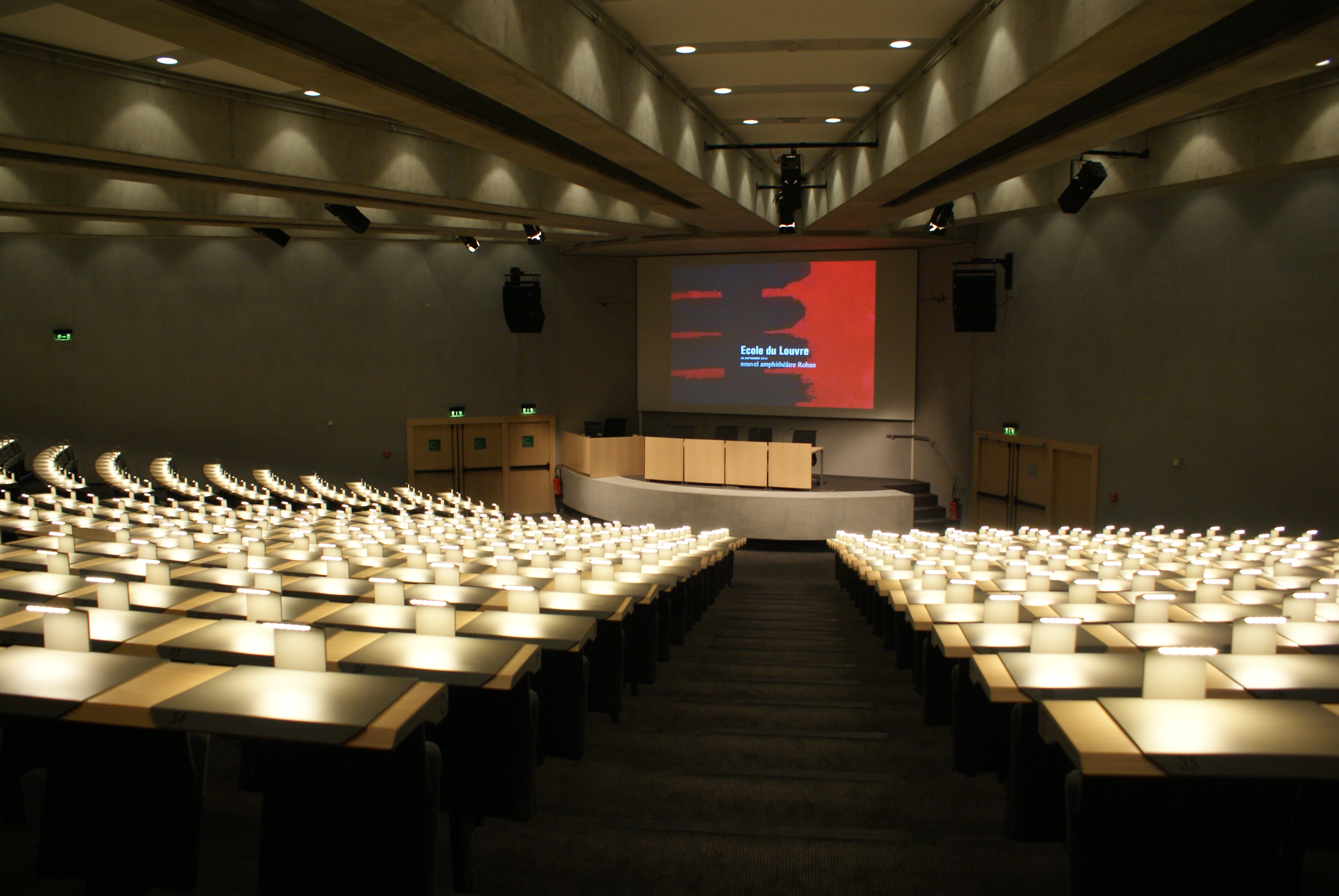
Amphithéâtre Rohan of the Ecole du Louvre, after renovation in 2014

In the late 17th century, the Louvre started to become the seat of the French royal academies. First, in 1672 Colbert allowed the Académie Française to meet on the ground floor of the Pavillon du Roi, in the Guards' Room of the former Queen Mother's apartment. Soon the Académie moved to the ground floor of the Lemercier Wing on the Cour Carrée, and also maintained its library there. The Académie des Inscriptions joined it in nearby rooms. The Académie royale de peinture et de sculpture had been established in the Grande Galerie until 1661, and returned to the Louvre in 1692, establishing itself in the Salon Carré and the nearby wing built by Le Vau on the Cour de la Reine, next to the Cabinet du Roi where a number of the king's paintings were kept. The Académie royale d'architecture moved to the Queen's apartment (in the southern wing of the Cour Carrée) in 1692. After a fire in 1740 it moved to the ground floor of the north wing. The Académie des Sciences also moved to the Louvre in the 1690s, and in 1699 moved from the ground-floor Bibliothèque du Roi to the former king's room, namely the Chambre de Parade, the Salle Henri II (antechamber) and the former Salle des Gardes (now Salle des Bronzes which was partitioned at that time. The Académie politique, a diplomats' training school, took over in the 1710s the large room on the third floor of the Pavillon de l'Horloge (now partitioned into offices).

From 1725, the Salon Carré, recently vacated with the return to Spain of the child Mariana Victoria, was used by the Académie royale de peinture et de sculpture for its yearly exhibition, which took from it its name of Salon. From 1763, the Académie also overtook the Galerie d'Apollon.

During the French Revolution, all academies were deemed to be fatally tainted by the Ancien régime associations and terminated on 8 August 1793. Barely more than two years later, however, they were recreated as the Institut de France on 24 October 1795, ceremonially inaugurated in the Lescot Wing's ground-floor room (the Louvre's Salle des Caryatides) on 4 April 1796. On 20 March 1805 Napoleon decided to relocate the Institut from the Louvre to its current seat at the former Collège des Quatre-Nations, which had been closed in 1791.

The Salon restarted on a yearly basis in the Salon Carré, until the Revolution of 1848. That year, the Louvre's energetic new director Philippe-Auguste Jeanron had it relocated to the Tuileries, so that the Salon Carré could be fully devoted to the museum's permanent exhibition. From 1857 the salon moved on from there to the newly built Palais de l'Industrie.

The École du Louvre was created in 1882 with the mission to "extract from the collections the knowledge they contain, and to train curators, missionaries and excavators". The school's curriculum originally focused on archaeology but soon expanded to related disciplines, such as art history and museography. In the early years, the school's sessions were held in the Cour Lefuel in two rooms of the former apartment of the great equerry, with entrance from the quayside. A large underground classroom, the amphithéâtre Courajod named after art historian and Louvre curator Louis Courajod, was built in 1932 on architect Albert Ferran's design under the Cour du Sphinx. It was replaced in the 1990s by the still larger amphithéâtre Rohan, also underground on the northern end of the Carrousel du Louvre. The former amphithéâtre Courajod was then transformed into exhibition rooms in which the Louvre's Coptic art collection is now displayed, including the architectonic pieces from Bawit.

=== Securities exchange ===
The national securities exchange (or Bourse) was located at the Louvre between 10 May 1795 and 9 September 1795, in Anne of Austria's former summer apartment on the ground floor of the Petite Galerie. This followed nearly two years of closure during which off-exchange speculation on Assignats went wild, after decades of operation of the Bourse in the Hôtel de Nevers from 24 September 1724 to 27 June 1793. In September 1795 the Bourse again closed for a few months; it reopened in January 1796 in the Church of Notre-Dame-des-Victoires where it stayed until 1807.

=== Administrative office building ===
During the Ancien Régime, administrative staff numbers in the machinery of government remained small and were dwarfed by the number of courtiers and domestic servants. That changed in the 19th century as the administrative arms of the state became increasingly significant, and the Louvre as a quintessential government building reflected that new reality. The installation of the Conseil d'État in the Lemercier Wing between 1824 and 1832 was a first step, since that body has administrative as well as judiciary competencies.

The office footprint within the Louvre increased considerably with Napoleon III's expansion. The new North (Richelieu) Wing included offices for use by various ministries:

- Plans were made for the short-lived ministère de l'Algérie et des Colonies (1858–1860) to be located in the Pavillon de Rohan and the adjacent wing to the west, but that department was terminated before the office space was made available;
- Plans were also made to locate the Directorate of Telegraphs and relocate the national printing office in the northern wing, but were not implemented.
- Most of the northern wing was used by the ministère d'Etat, including the prestige apartment for the minister;
- The ministère de la Maison de l'Empereur was separated from the ministère d'Etat in 1860, and located in the spaces previously reserved for the Algeria Ministry;
- The short-lived ministère des Beaux-Arts led by Maurice Richard from May to September 1870 was also located in the northern wing. Under the Government of National Defense formed on 4 September 1870, the Fine Arts administration relocated to the Hôtel de Rochechouart under the Ministry of Public Instruction, where it remained until the formation of the Ministry of Culture in 1959.

On 29 May 1871, a mere few days after the Tuileries' fire, France's government head Adolphe Thiers attributed all administrative offices and barracks space in the Louvre's northern wing to the French Finance Ministry, whose buildings further west on the rue de Rivoli had been entirely destroyed. The Finance Ministry remained there for more than a century, until the late 1980s. A meeting of finance ministers of the Group of Seven countries, hosted at the Louvre on 22 February 1987, gave its name to the Louvre Accord.

Further west, projects were made in the 1880s to relocate the National Court of Audit (cour des comptes) – whose previous offices in the Palais d'Orsay, where the Musée d'Orsay now stands, had also been burned down – in the Aile de Marsan which had just been reconstructed and expanded by Lefuel. Only archives of the Court were deposited there in 1884, however, and these spaces were eventually attributed in 1897 to what is now the Musée des Arts Décoratifs.

The Ministry of Colonies was installed in the Flore Wing from 1893 to 1909. The museum then planned to expand into the Flore Wing but that was thwarted during World War I as the facility was used by the wartime bond issuance service. The Finance Ministry, together with the National Lottery it created in 1933, remained there and stayed until 1961.

The Louvre museum itself keeps offices in various parts of the building, e.g. in the former apartment of the Great Equerry (museum direction), on the top floors of the Pavillon de l'Horloge, and in part of the entresol under the Grande Galerie.

=== City Hall of Paris ===
After the Paris City Hall was arsoned at the end of the Commune in May 1871, the Municipal Council of Paris and Prefect of the Seine first moved to the Luxembourg Palace across the Seine, but they had to leave that building in 1878 as the French Senate prepared to move back from their previous temporary location in the Palace of Versailles, and relocated for several years in the aile de Flore of the Louvre. The new City Hall was formally inaugurated on 13 July 1882 but it took significantly longer to finish the interior works, with some ceremonial rooms only completed in 1906. While in the Louvre the Municipal Council's meetings were held in Napoleon III's unfinished Salle des Etats of the Pavillon des Sessions, from 1878 to 1883. The Bibliothèque de l'hôtel de ville de Paris left the Louvre in 1887 to its current City Hall location. The offices of the Prefecture and apartment of Préfet Eugène Poubelle remained in the Pavillon de Flore until 1893, when they were replaced by the Ministry of Colonies, despite an 1883 order (décret) that had transferred the entire aile de Flore to the museum.

=== Sculpture garden ===
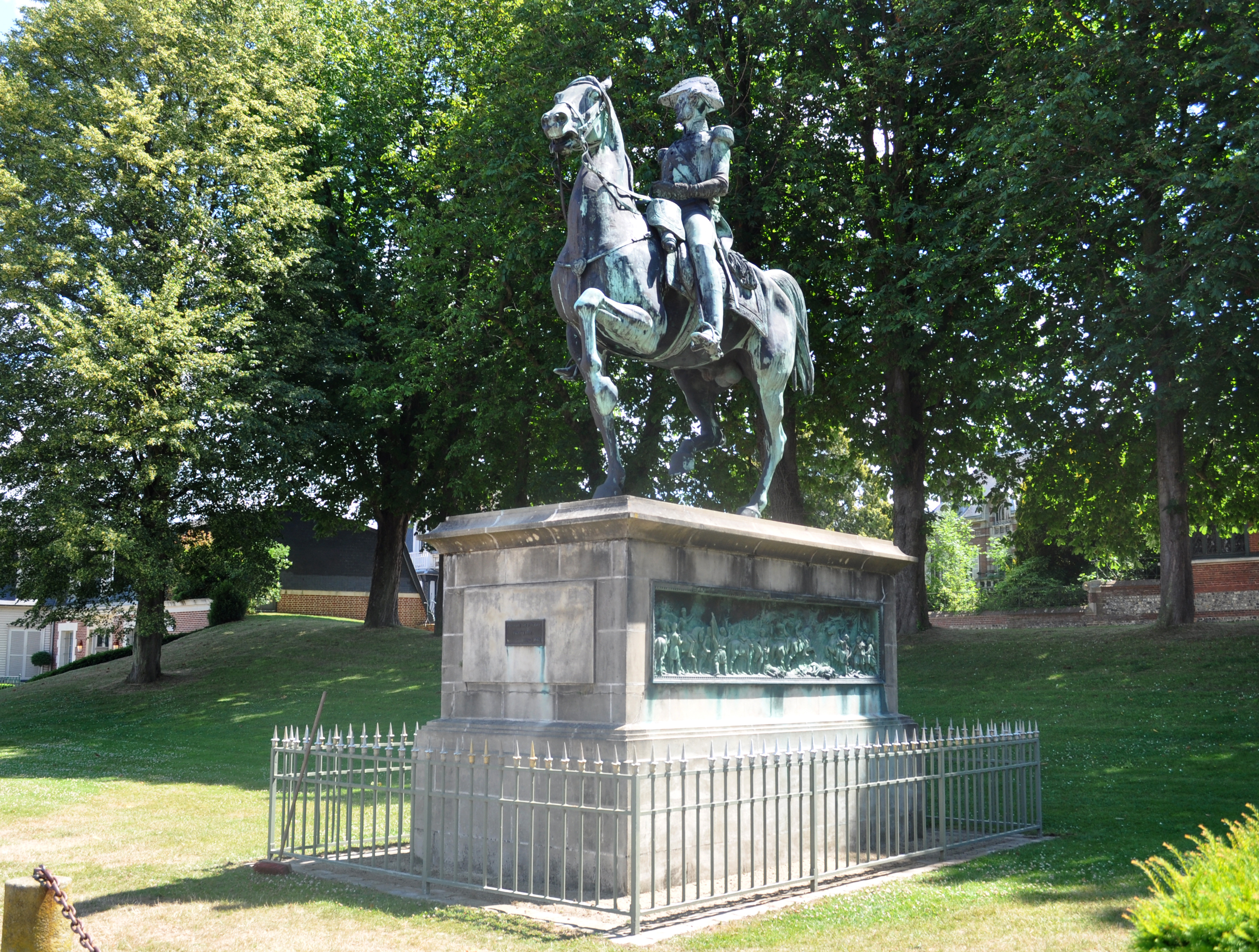
Carlo Marochetti's Duke of Orléans, placed in 1845 in the Cour Carrée and now at Château d'Eu

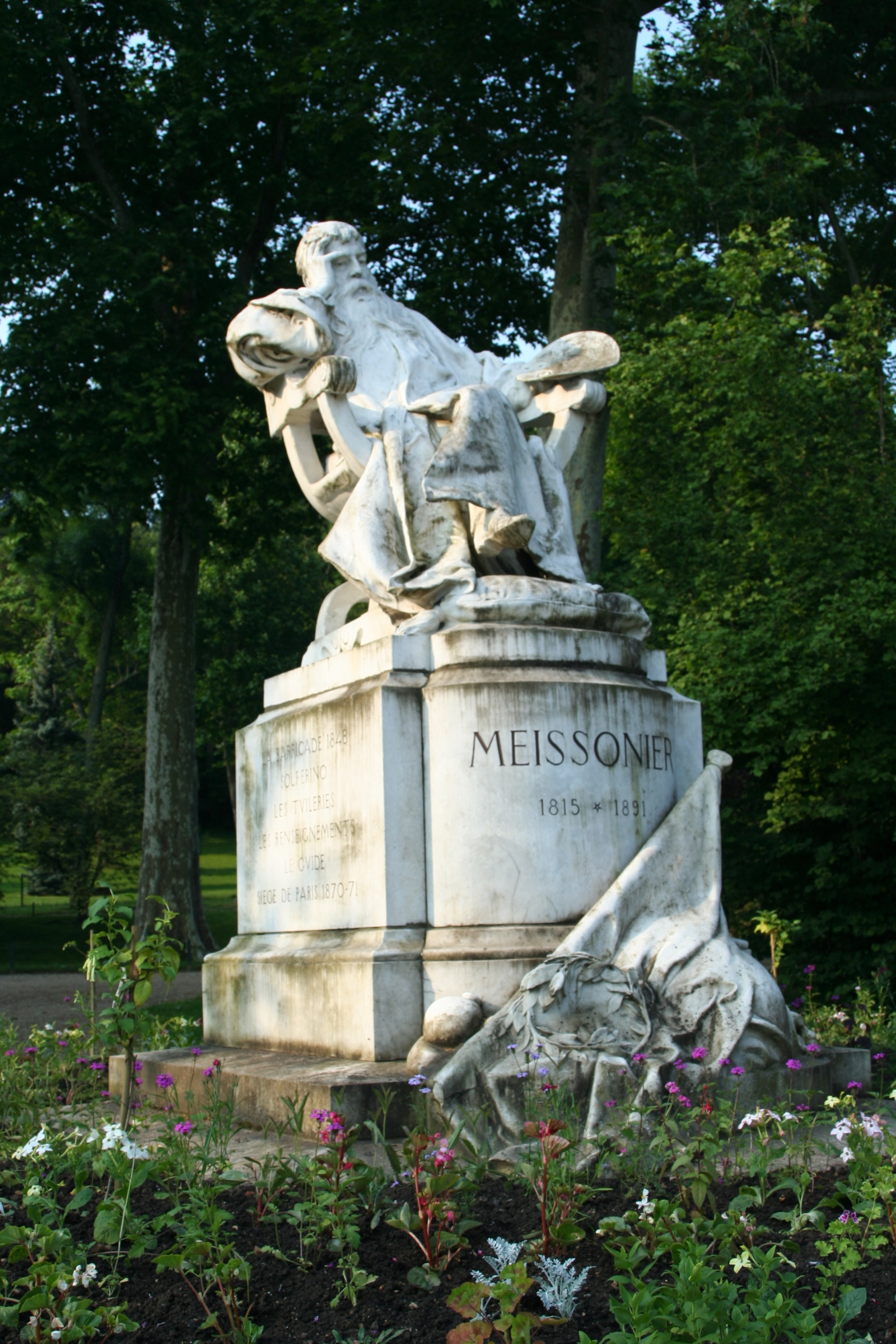
Antonin Mercié's Meissonier, placed in 1895 in the Jardin de l'Infante, now in Poissy

While the Louvre is rich with architectural sculpture, its position in the midst of a bustling city neighborhood was long unfavorable to the display of freestanding sculpture, with few exceptions that included the temporary display of a colossal statue of Vulcan in the Louvre's courtyard during Charles V's visit in 1540. In the early 17th century, a bronze sculpture by Francesco Bordoni was erected at the center of the Queen's garden (jardin de la Reine), now jardin de l'Infante to the south of the Pavillon du Roi.

During the 19th century, the Louvre's open spaces multiplied and the public taste for sculpture and monuments simultaneously increased. An early project was made in the late 1820s to place the Great Sphinx of Tanis in the center of the Cour Carrée, but was not implemented.

Instead, on 28 October 1845 an equestrian statue of Ferdinand Philippe, Duke of Orléans was placed on that spot, itself a second cast of a monument by Carlo Marochetti erected in Algiers earlier that year. But that did not last long, and the statue was relocated to Versailles shortly after the Revolution of 1848 (it was moved again in 1971 to its present location at the Château d'Eu). In the early Second Empire, plans were made to erect equestrian statues of Francis I in the Cour Carrée and Charlemagne and Napoleon respectively in the two squares of the Cour Napoléon. A plaster model of Auguste Clésinger's equestrian Francis I was placed in the Cour Carrée between December 1855 to February 1856, when it was transferred to the Crystal Palace on Sydenham Hill in London. On 15 January 1863 Clésinger was also tasked to create the statue of Charlemagne, on which he worked until 1871. The statue of Napoleon was commissioned on 26 August 1862 from then-prominent sculptor Eugène Guillaume, who apparently only produced several small-scale models.

Sculpted monuments mushroomed around the Louvre in the late 19th and early 20th century. Most of them were removed in 1933 on the initiative of Education Minister Anatole de Monzie, due to changing tastes:

- Marble monument to François Boucher by Jean-Paul Aubé (1890), in the Jardin de la Colonnade, removed in 1933 and now at the Municipal Museum in Longwy
- Equestrian statue of Diego Velázquez by Emmanuel Frémiet (1892), in the Jardin de la Colonnade, relocated in 1933 to the Casa de Velázquez in Madrid and destroyed during the Spanish Civil War
- Marble version of the group titled Quand même !, a celebration of the resistance of Belfort during the Franco-Prussian War by Antonin Mercié, installed in 1894 in the Carrousel Garden, removed in 1933 and now at Fort Mont-Valérien
- Marble statue of Ernest Meissonier by Antonin Mercié (1895), in the Jardin de l'Infante, removed in 1966 and relocated in 1980 in the Parc Meissonier at Poissy
- Monument to Auguste Raffet by Emmanuel Frémiet (1896), in the Jardin de la Colonnade, bronze parts melted in the early 1940s during the German occupation, the rest removed in 1966
- Bronze statue of Jean-Léon Gérôme sculpting his Gladiators, by Aimé Morot (1909), in the Jardin de l'Oratoire, removed in 1967 and now at the Musée d'Orsay
- Marble statue of Paris during the War 1914–1918 by Albert Bartholomé (1921), removed in 1933 and kept in a damaged state in the Bois de Vincennes

In 1907 Étienne Dujardin-Beaumetz, then an undersecratary of state in charge of France's fine arts policy, fostered the creation of a sculpture garden in the western octagonal garden of the Cour Napoléon, dubbed the "campo santo". The monumental bronze group Le Temps et le Génie de l'Art by Victor Ségoffin was placed in the center in 1908. Around it were allegorical and commemorative sculptures:

- The sons of Cain, bronze by Paul Landowski (1906), now in the Tuileries Garden
- Architecture, Côte-d'Or stone, also by Landowski (1908), since 1933 on Saint-Nicaise Hill in Reims,
- Painting, marble by Aimé Octobre (1909), now at the Musée de Tessé in Le Mans
- Pierre de Montreuil, marble by Henri Bouchard (1909), since 1935 in a public garden next to the Basilica of Saint-Denis
- Michel Colombe, bronze by Jean Boucher (1909), moved to Tours in 1933 and melted in 1942
- Puget, marble by François-Léon Sicard (1910), since 1933 on Place Leverrier in Marseille
- Poussin, marble by Constant Roux (1911), since 1934 in Les Andelys
- Hardouin-Mansart, bronze by Ernest Henri Dubois (1908), since the 1930s at the Jardin de l'Intendant of Les Invalides
- Watteau, marble by Henri-Édouard Lombard (1909), since 1937 in front of the Musée des Beaux-Arts de Valenciennes
- Houdon, marble by Paul Gasq (1909), since 1935 in Lisieux
- Corot, marble by François-Raoul Larche (1908), since 1935 in Ville-d'Avray

Two more memorials, of François Rude by Sicard and Jean-Baptiste-Siméon Chardin by Larche, were commissioned but not completed. All these sculptures, except Landowski's Sons of Cain, were also removed in 1933. Ségoffin's group was transferred to the southern French town of Saint-Gaudens in 1935, and melted down during World War II. Landowski's Sons of Cain was eventually moved in 1984 to its current location on the terrasse du bord de l'eau of the Tuileries Garden.

In the eastern octagonal garden, an equestrian statue of La Fayette, by Paul Wayland Bartlett, was erected in 1908. This initiative had been sponsored in 1899 by American diplomat Robert John Thompson in gratitude of the French gift of the Statue of Liberty, and originally intended for a dedication at Lafayette's grave at the Picpus Cemetery during the Exposition Universelle (1900). In preparation for the Grand Louvre remodeling, the Lafayette monument was moved in 1985 to its current location on the Cours-la-Reine.

In 1964, Culture Minister André Malraux decided to install in the Carrousel Garden 21 bronze sculptures by Aristide Maillol which had been donated to the French state by the sculptor's former model and muse, Dina Vierny, including casts of Air, Action in Chains, The Mountain, and The River. The Maillol statues were rearranged during the overhaul of the garden in the 1990s.

Most recently, as part of the Grand Louvre project designed by I. M. Pei, a cast made in lead in 1986 of the marble Equestrian statue of Louis XIV by Gian Lorenzo Bernini has been placed in the Cour Napoléon, in front of the Louvre Pyramid and marking the end of Paris's Axe historique. This was intended as a tribute to Bernini's past role as architect of the Louvre in 1664–1666, even though his plans were not executed.

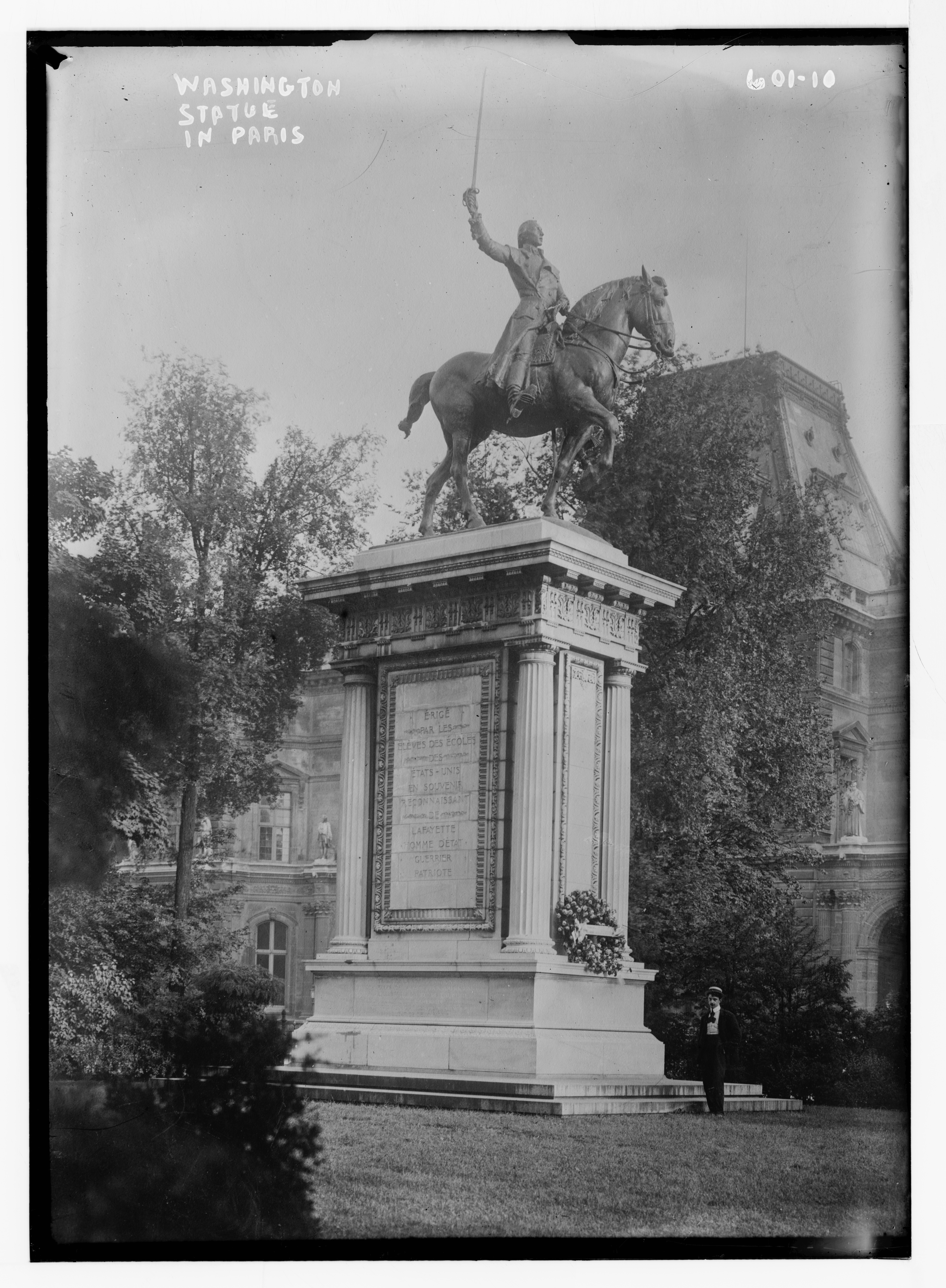
Lafayette Monument in the Cour Napoléon, early 20th century

Landowski's Sons of Cain in the Cour Napoléon, 1968

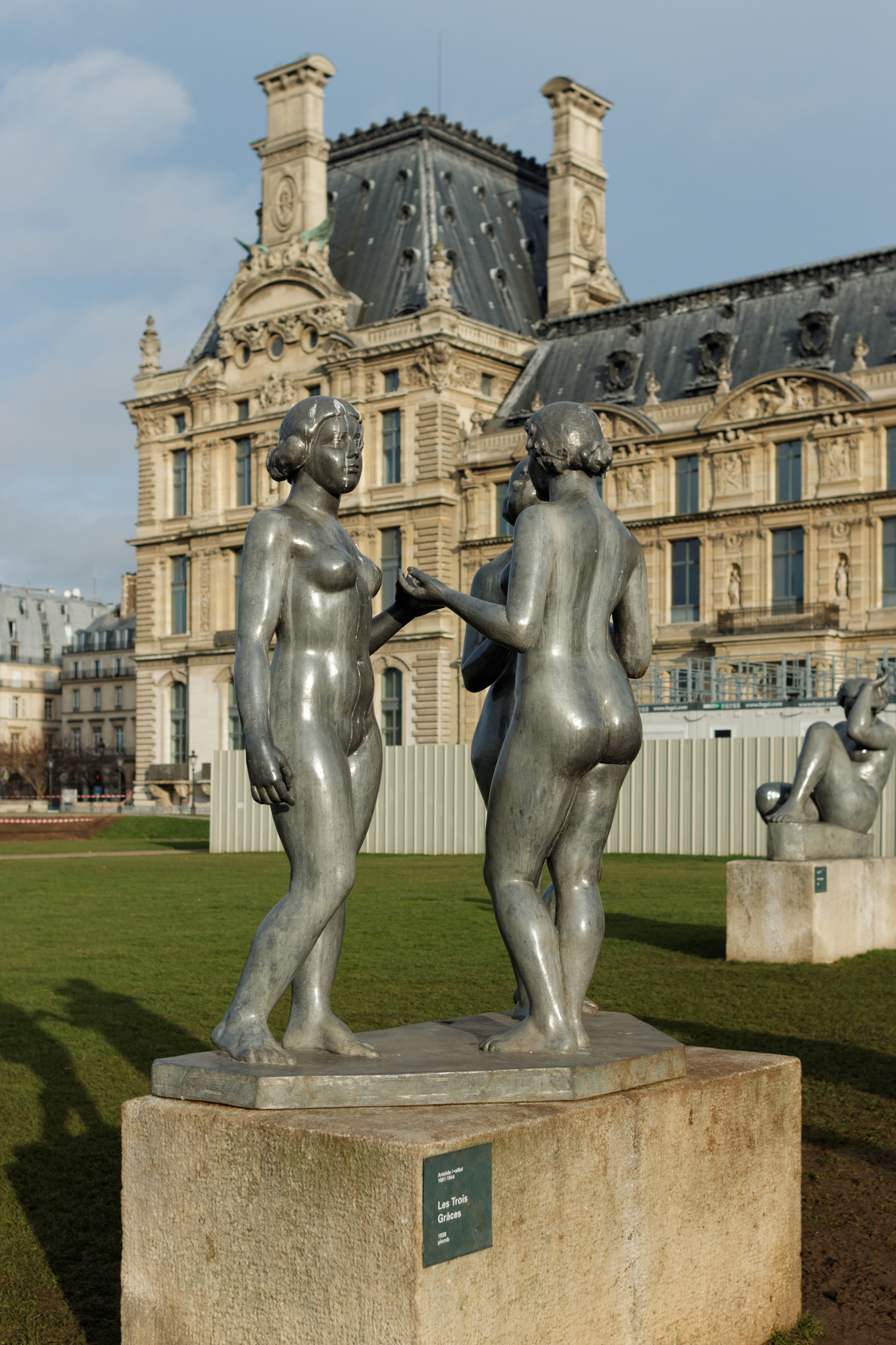
Maillol's Les Trois Grâces

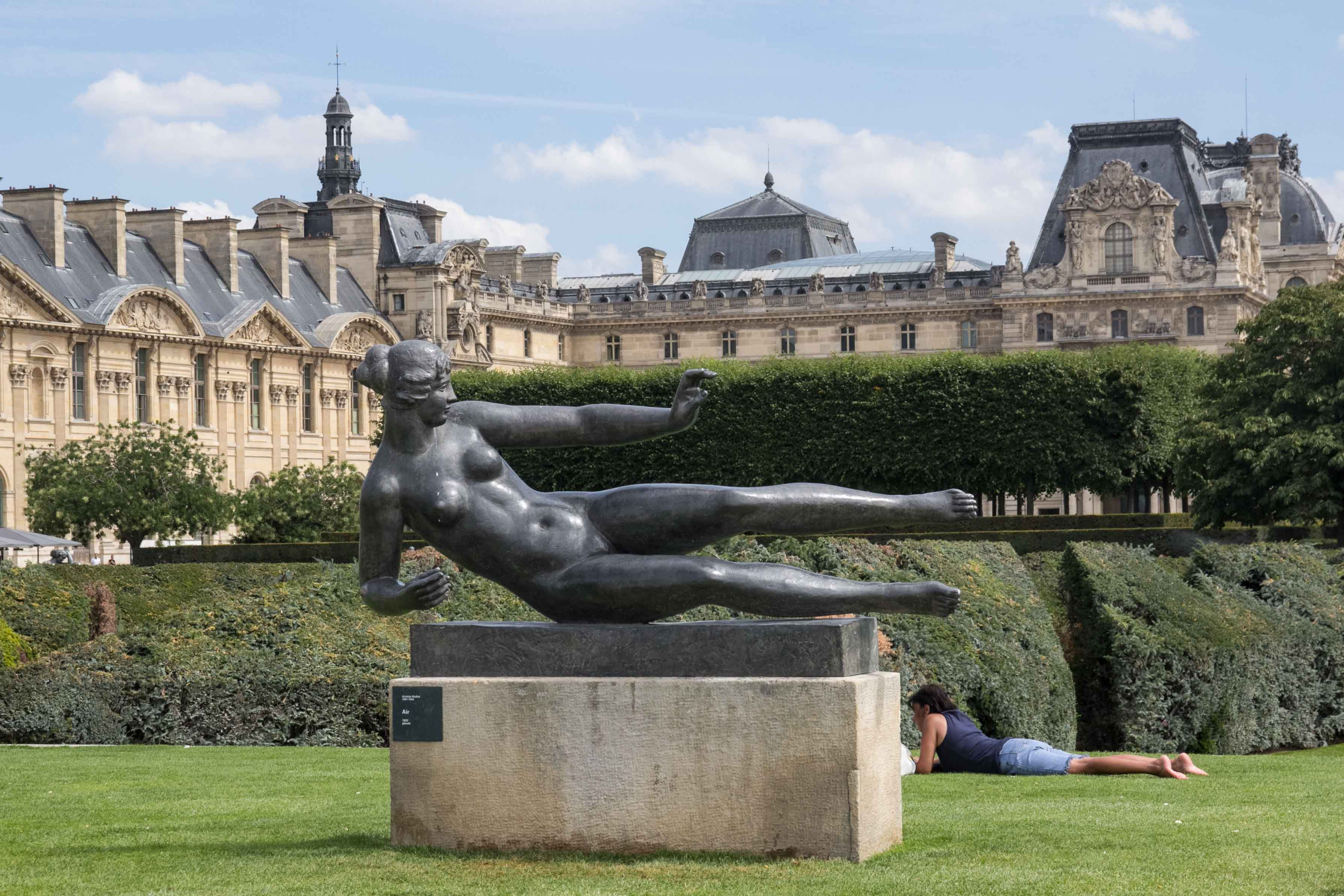
Maillol's L'Air

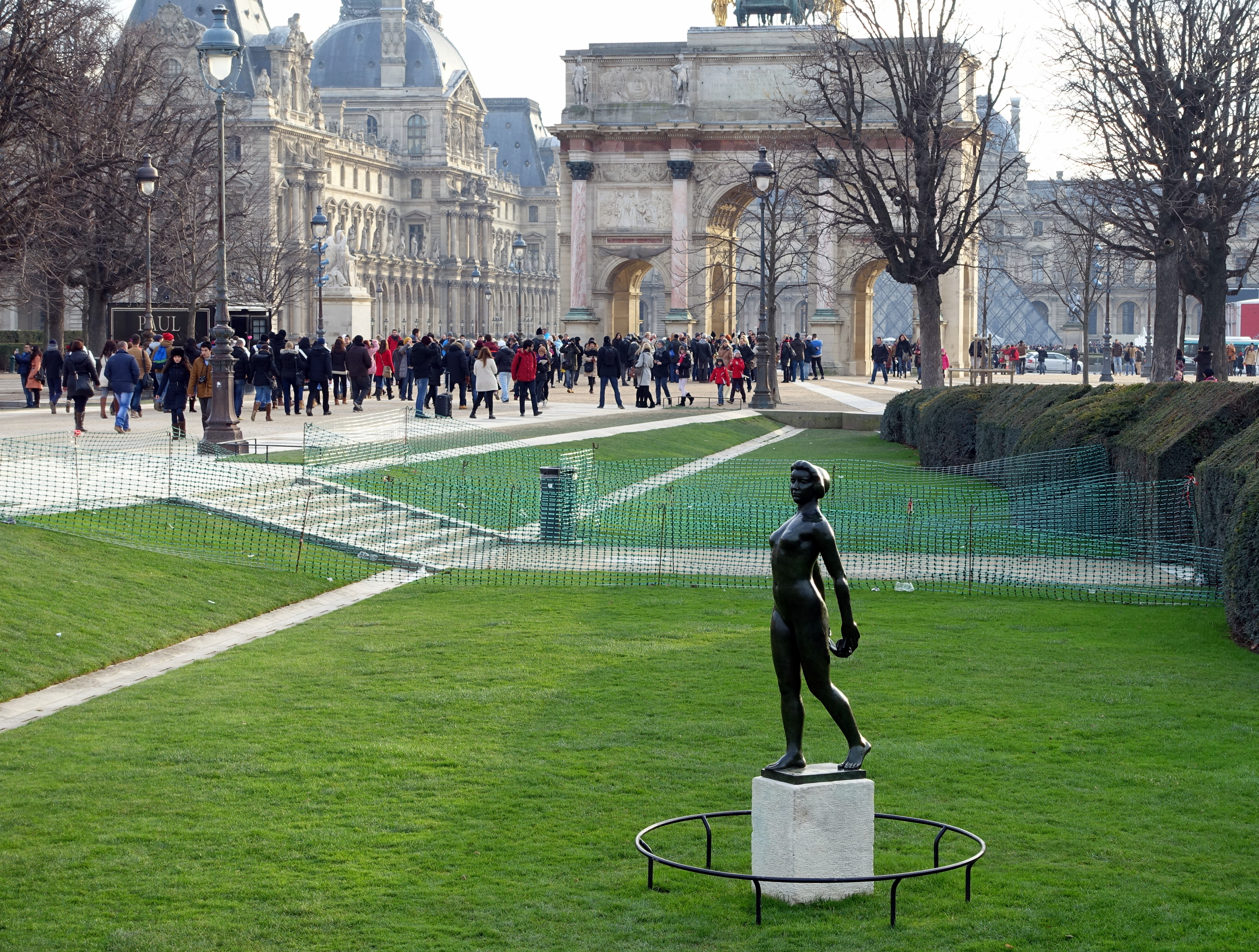
Maillol's Ile-de-France

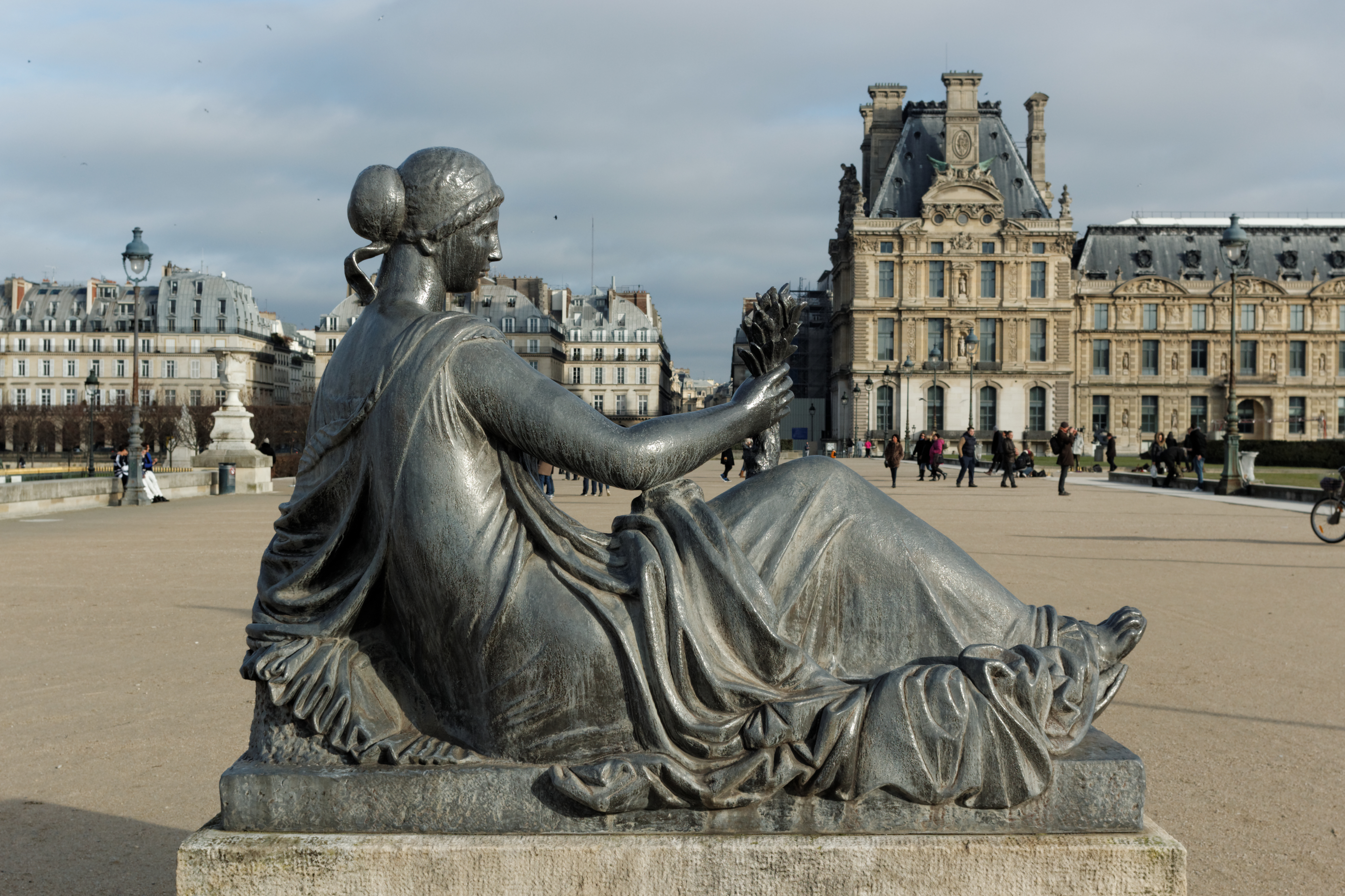
Maillol's Monument aux morts de Port-Vendres

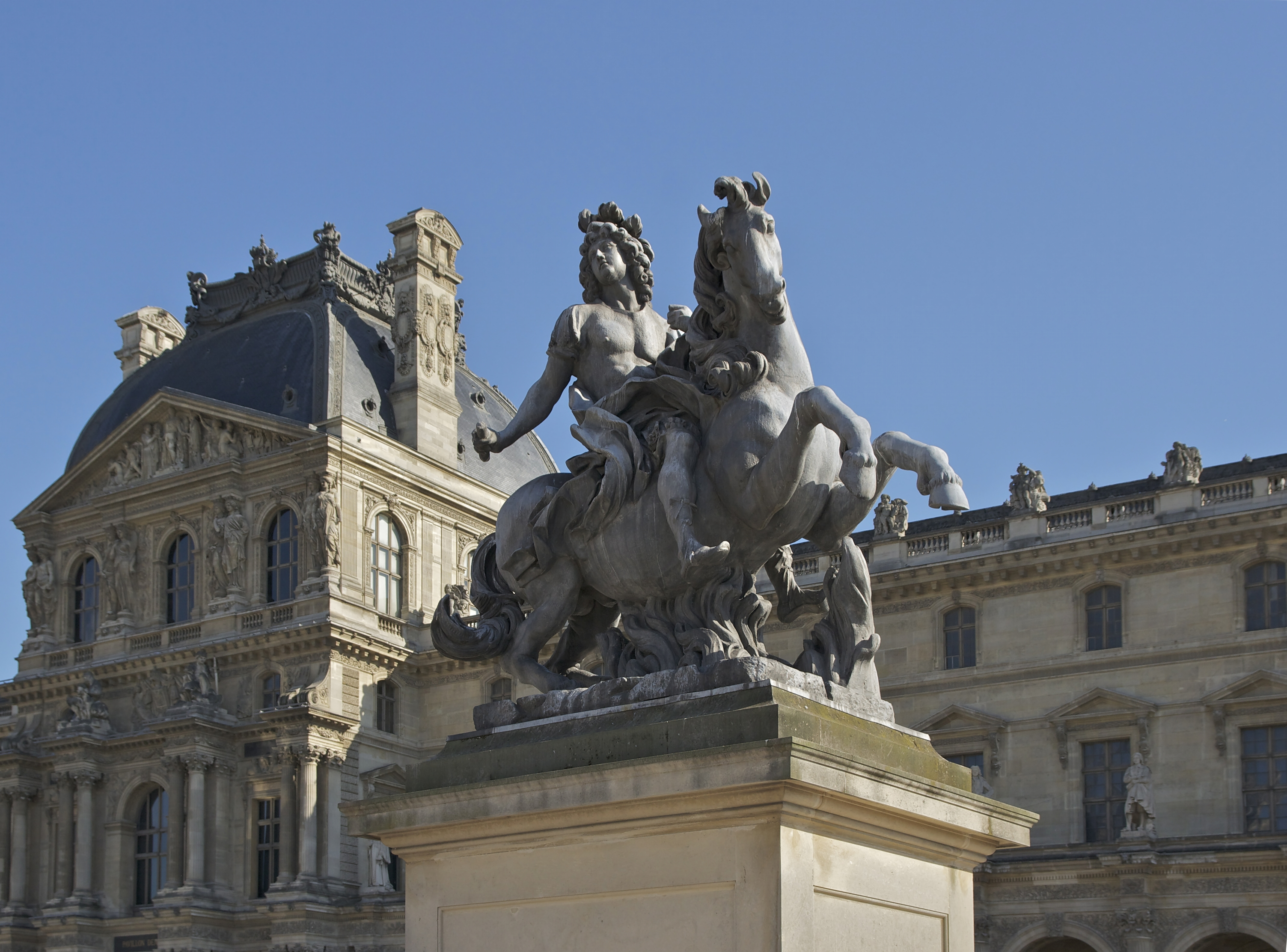
Bernini's Louis XIV in the Cour Napoléon

=== Research facility ===
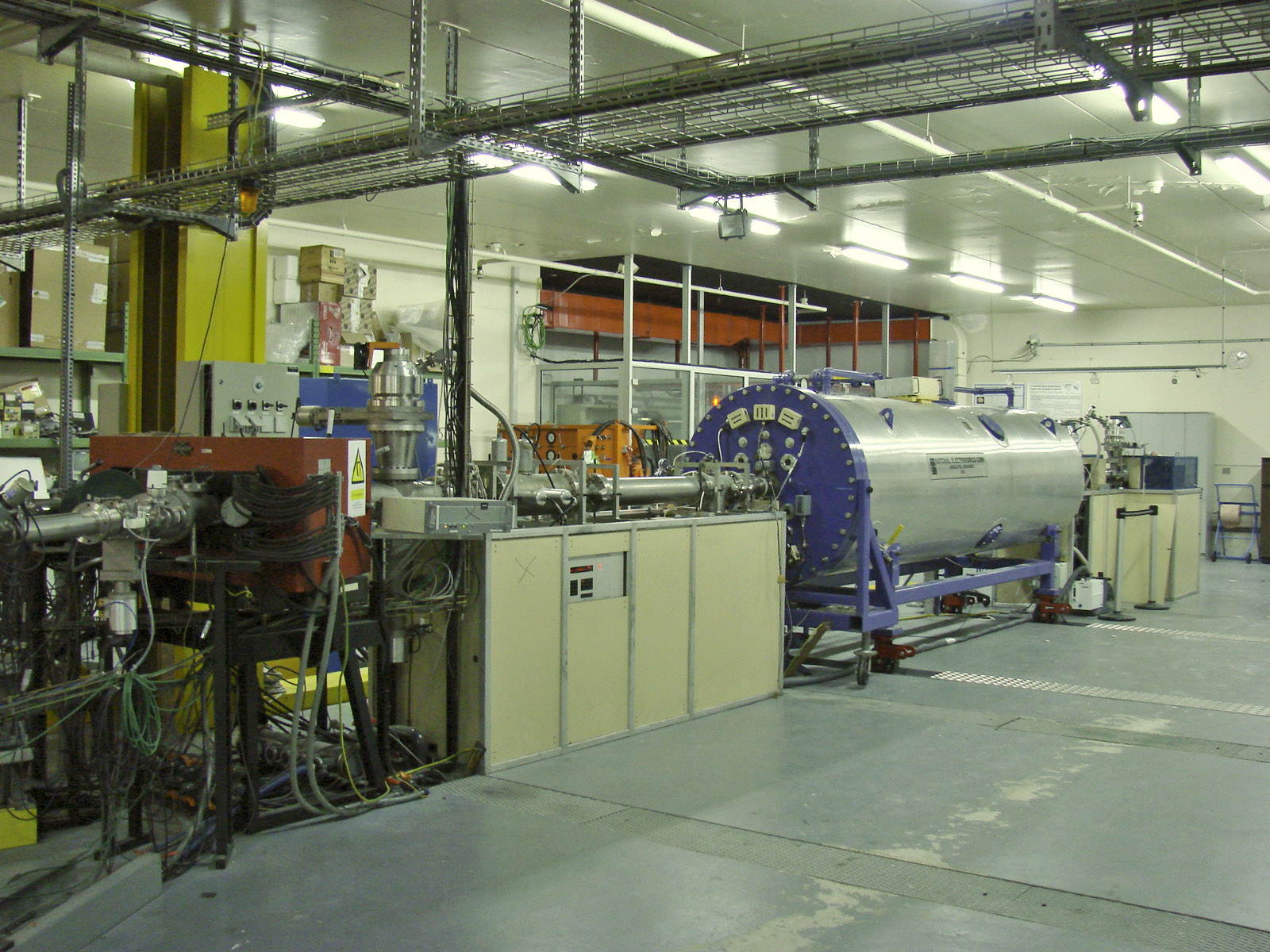
The C2RMF's particle accelerator AGLAE, located under the Cour du Carrousel

The Laboratoire du département des peintures du Musée du Louvre was created in 1932 to support research on paintings and leverage new analysis techniques. In 1968 it became the Laboratoire de recherche des Musées de France, with a national mandate but still located at the Louvre. In 1998, this laboratory merged with the Service de restauration des Musées de France to form the Center for Research and Restoration of Museums of France (C2RMF), located in the Pavillon de Flore.

=== Dining and shopping venue ===
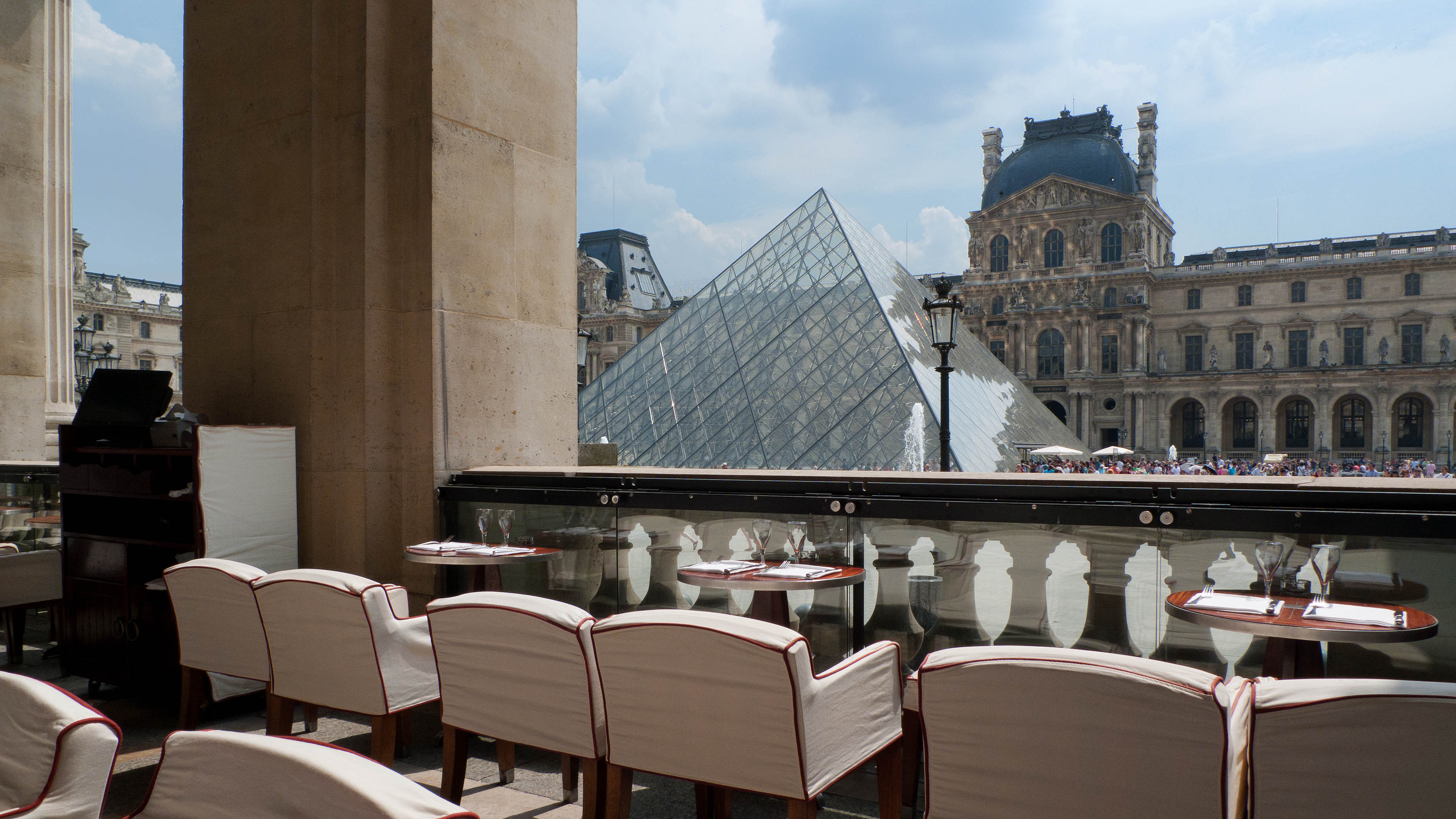
Café Marly and the Cour Napoléon, photographed in 2010

The Louvre Palace is host to several restaurants and cafés. As of 2021, the most prominent is the Café Marly, opened in 1994 in the Richelieu Wing with a terrace on the Cour Napoléon, named after the Louvre's nearby Cour Marly and designed by Olivier Gagnère It was created by restaurateur Gilbert Costes on a concession contract from the museum. Inside the museum are the Café Richelieu, opened in 1993 and designed by Jean-Pierre Raynaud and Daniel Buren, and Café Mollien, redesigned in 2016 by Mathieu Lehanneur; the intimate Café Denon that had opened in 1998 on a quiet corner of the Cour Lefuel closed in the 2010s.

Close to the Louvre Palace's northwestern tip, the restaurant Loulou opened in 2016 in the Aile de Marsan with a terrace on the Carrousel Garden, designed by Joseph Dirand and replacing a previous restaurant on the same spot, Le Saut du Loup. A high-end restaurant named Le Grand Louvre opened in 1989 on the mezzanine of the Hall Napoléon, under the Louvre Pyramid, and was operated by chef Yves Pinard; its inaugural event was the dinner of the 15th G7 summit. The underground Carrousel du Louvre shopping mall is home to fast food outlets grouped in one of the first food courts in Paris, opened in 1993 and rebranded in 2009 as Restaurants du monde.

From 1608 to 1806, the ground floor of the Grande Galerie hosted a number of shops in which artists and artisans peddled their creations. They were closed by order of Napoleon. Aside from museum shops, the Louvre experienced a revival of retail commercial activity with the opening in 1993 of the Carrousel du Louvre shopping mall, whose largest slot was initially leased by a Virgin Megastore until 2012, and by Printemps since 2014. France's first Apple Store was also located there and operated from 2009 to 2018.

== Chronological plan of the construction of the Louvre ==
The oldest part of the above-ground Louvre is the southwest corner of the square block that faces the center of Paris to the east. This corner section, consisting of the Lescot Wing (1) and the north side of the western part of the south wing (2), was designed and constructed in the 16th century by Pierre Lescot, who replaced the corresponding wings of the medieval Louvre (not shown). Later that century, the Petite Galerie (4) was added, connecting the Louvre to the section of the wall of Charles V which ran along the north bank of the Seine toward the Tuileries Palace (3, 5, 8, 11, 14; destroyed by fire in 1871). Around 1600, during the reign of Henry IV, the wall along the river was replaced with the Grande Galerie (6, 7), which provided a covered passage from the Louvre to Tuileries Palace and later was the first part of the Louvre to become a museum. The Lescot Wing was expanded north with the Lemercier Wing (9) under Louis XIII, and in the second half of the 17th century, during the reign of Louis XIV, the Petite Galerie was enlarged (10, 13) and the remaining wings around the Square Court (12, 16) were constructed, but not totally completed until the first part of the 19th century under Napoleon, who also added the Arc du Carrousel (17) and parts of the north wing (17) along the rue de Rivoli. Later in the 19th century, the north wing was slightly extended (18) by Louis XVIII. From 1852 to 1857, Napoleon III connected the north wing to the buildings surrounding the Square Court with the Richelieu Wing (19, north part) and enlarged the Grande Galerie with the Denon Wing (19, south part). In 1861–1870 his architect Hector Lefuel carried out further work, replacing the Pavillon de Flore and the western section of the Grande Galerie (7) and adding the Pavillon des Sessions (20, also known as the Pavillon des États). In 1874–1880 he replaced the Pavillon de Marsan (15) and extended the south facade of the adjacent Marsan Wing (21).

Plan of Louvre and Tuileries by stage of construction

Plan of Louvre and Tuileries by stage of construction
	Time	King	Architect
1	1545–1549	Francis I, Henry II	Pierre Lescot
2	1559–1574	Francis II, Charles IX, Henry III	Pierre Lescot
3	1564–1570	Catherine de' Medici	Philibert Delorme
4	1566	Catherine de' Medici	Pierre Lescot
5	1570–1572	Catherine de' Medici	Jean Bullant
6	1595–1610	Henry IV	Louis Métezeau
7	1595–1610	Henry IV	Jacques II Androuet du Cerceau
8	1595–1610	Henry IV	Jacques II Androuet du Cerceau
9	1624–1654	Louis XIII, Louis XIV	Jacques Lemercier
10	1653–1655	Louis XIV	Louis Le Vau
11	1659–1662	Louis XIV	Louis Le Vau, Carlo Vigarani
12	1659–1664	Louis XIV	Louis Le Vau
13	1661–1664	Louis XIV	Louis Le Vau
14	1664–1666	Louis XIV	Louis Le Vau
15	1664–1666	Louis XIV	Louis Le Vau
16	1667–1670	Louis XIV	Louis Le Vau, Claude Perrault, Charles Le Brun
17	1806–1811	Napoleon	Charles Percier, Pierre Fontaine
18	1816–1824	Louis XVIII	Pierre Fontaine
19	1852–1857	Napoleon III	Louis Visconti, Hector Lefuel
20	1861–1870	Napoleon III	Hector Lefuel
21	1874–1880	French Third Republic	Hector Lefuel

== Photo gallery ==
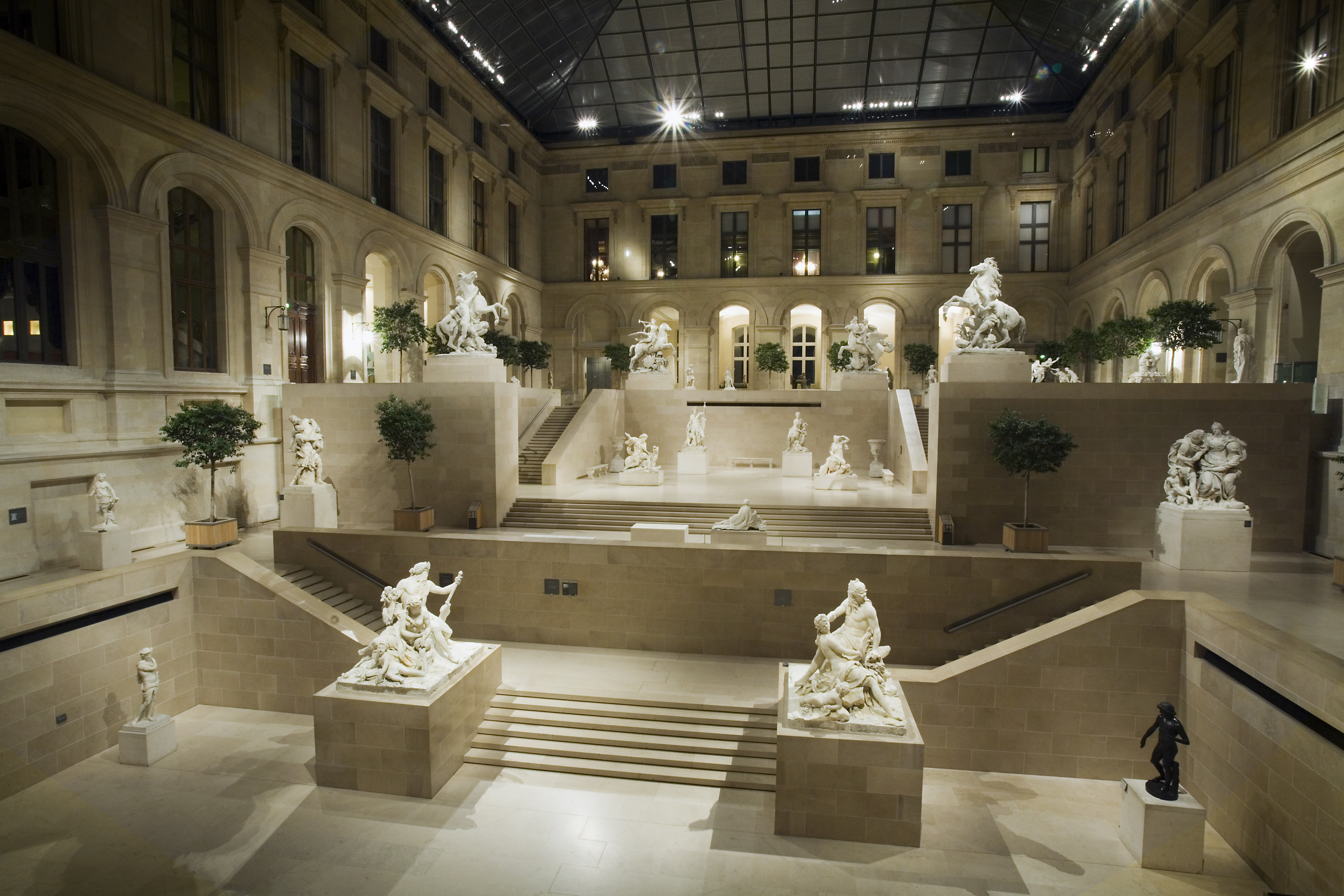
French sculpture in the Cour Marly in the renovated Richelieu wing of the Grand Louvre, viewed toward the west

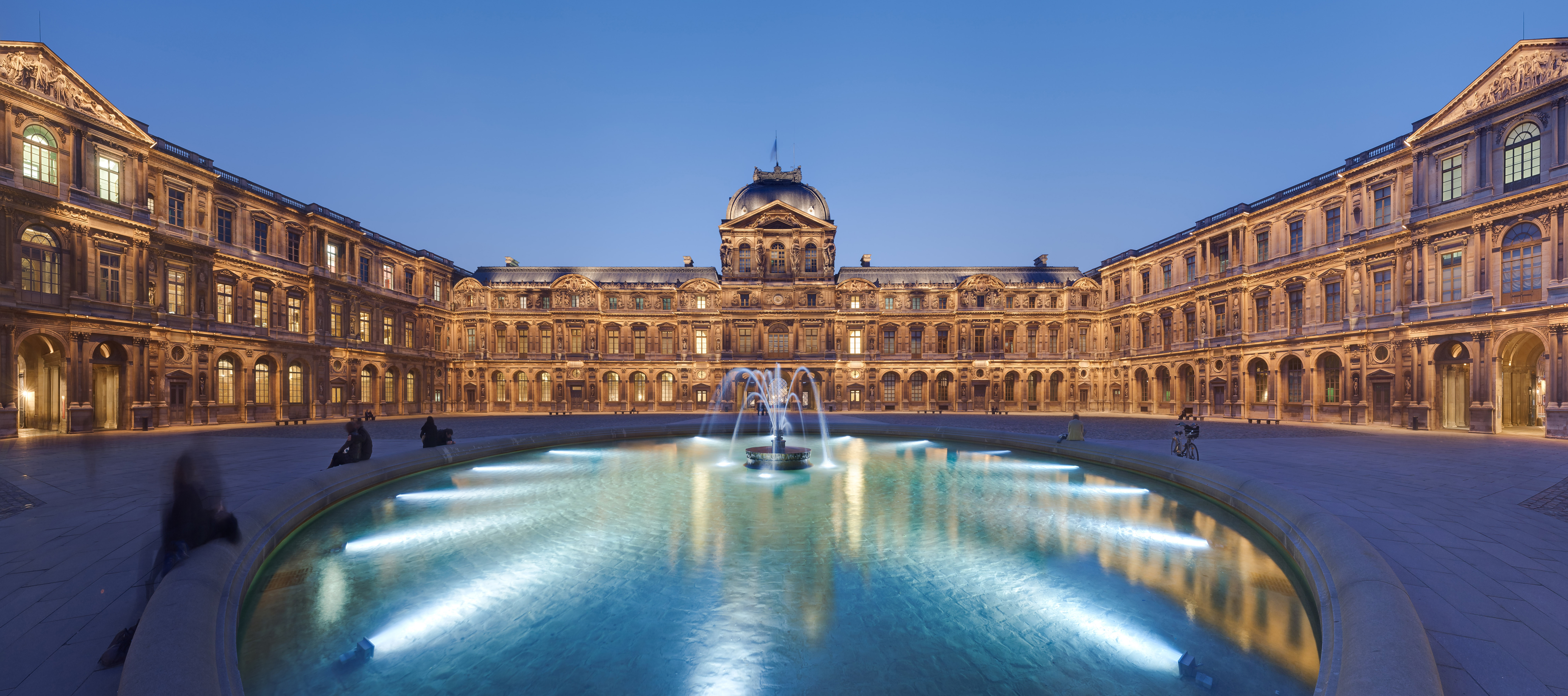
Panoramic view of the Cour Carrée, from the central courtyard fountain toward the west

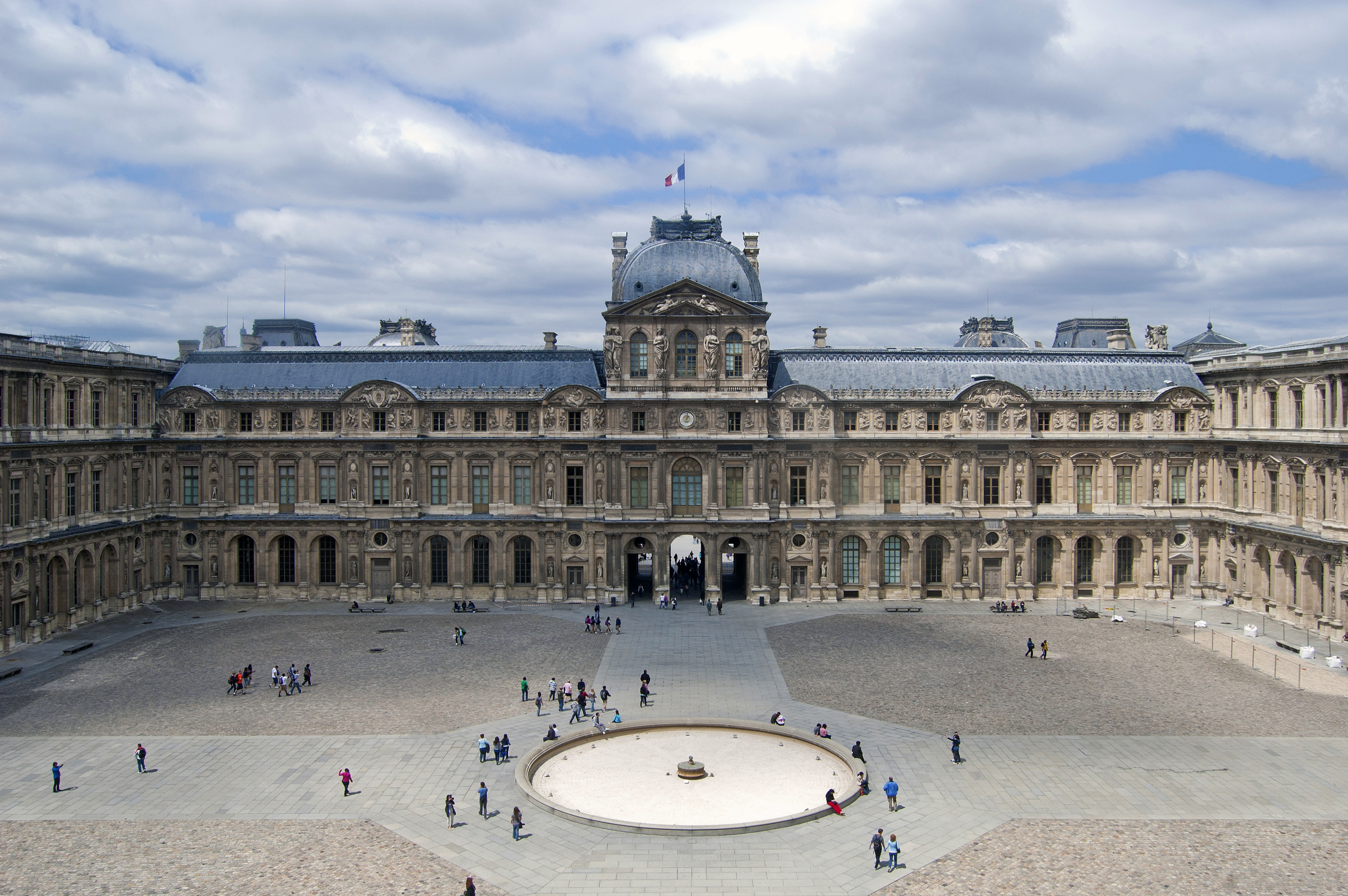
The Cour Carrée of the "Old Louvre" looking west (Left to right: Aile Lescot, Pavillon Sully (de l'Horloge), Aile Lemercier)

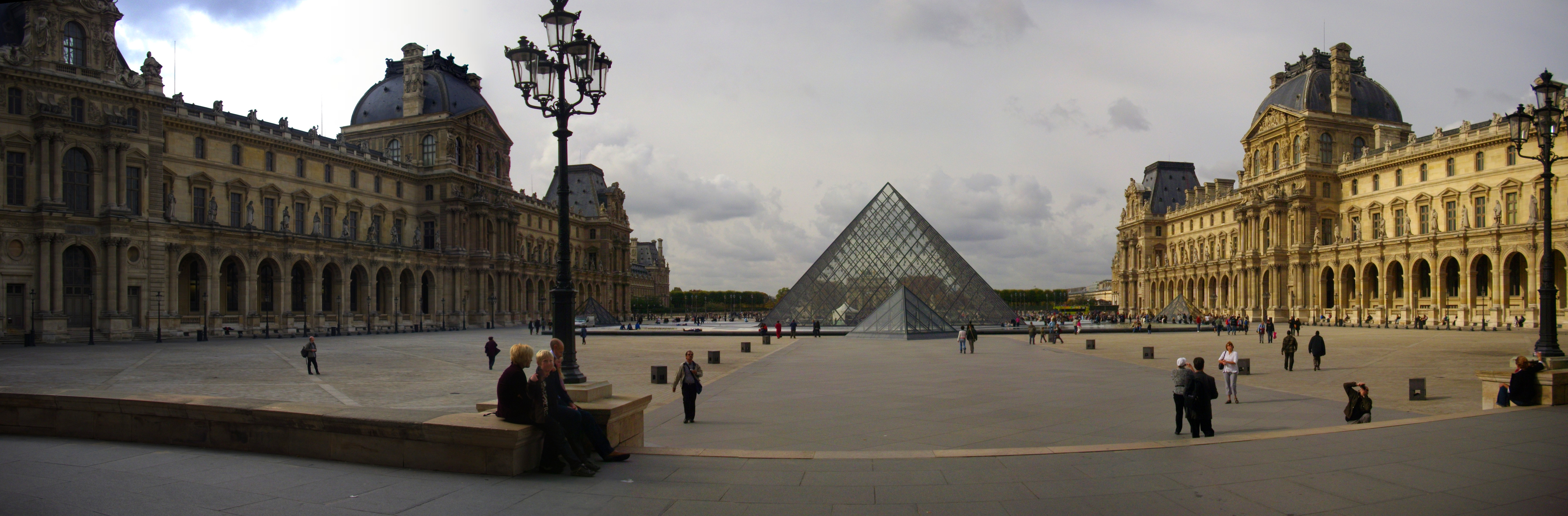
The Louvre Palace looking west across the Cour Napoleon and the Louvre Pyramid

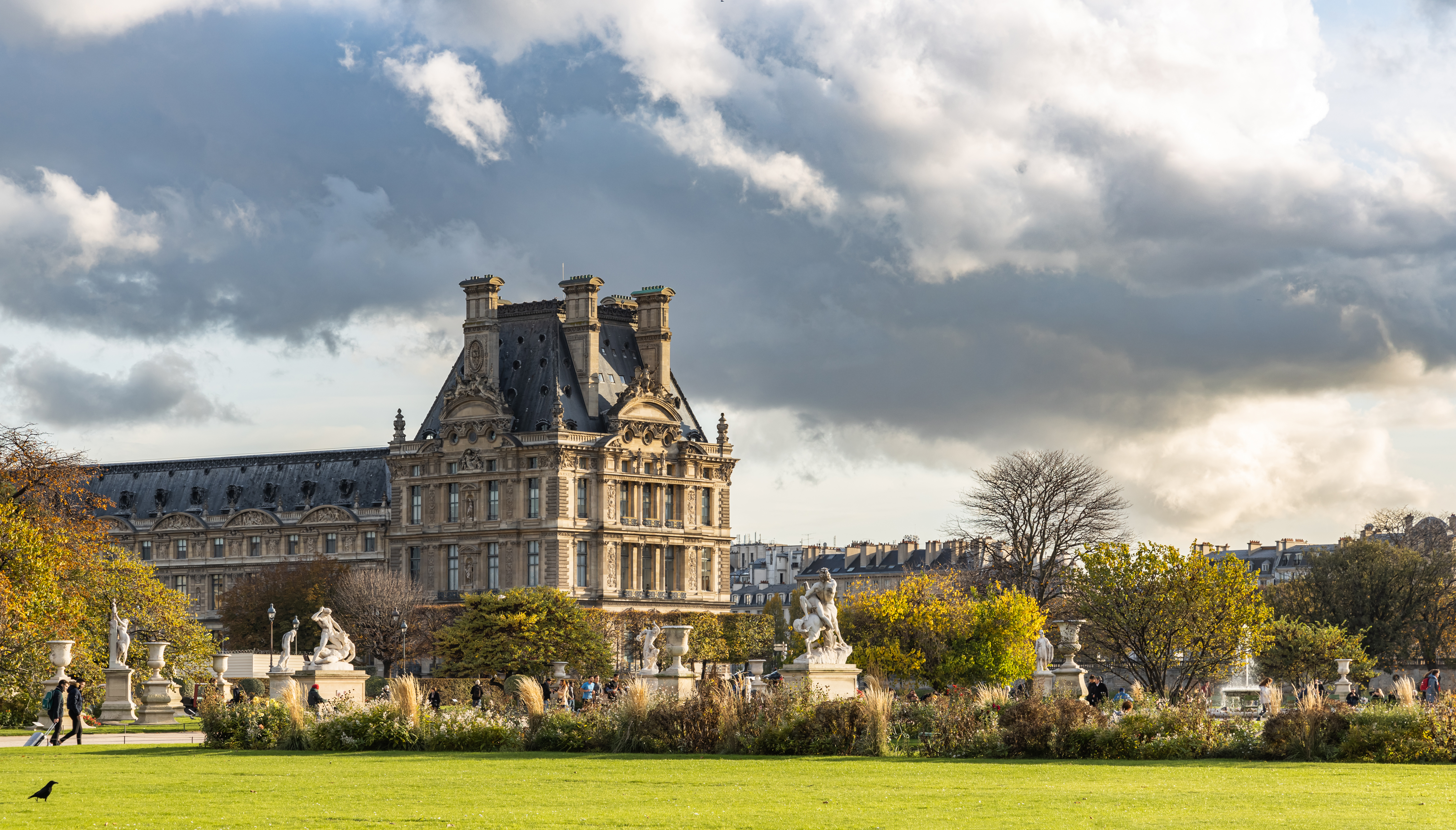
Pavillon de Flore as seen from the Tuileries Garden

== See also ==
- Palais de la Cité
- Versailles Palace
