= Escalier Daru =

Staircase in the Louvre, Paris

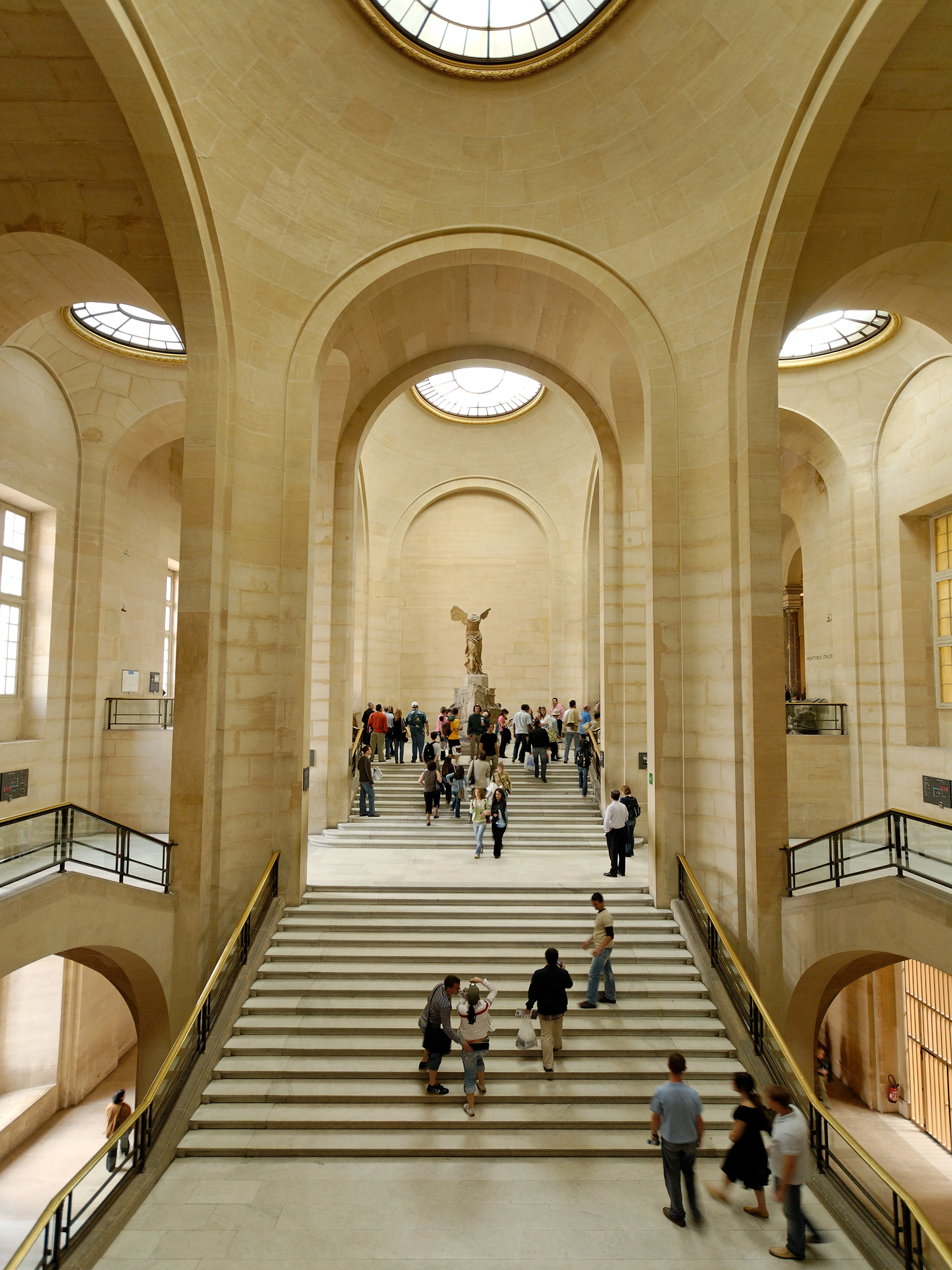
Escalier Daru with the Winged Victory of Samothrace in the background

The Escalier Daru (Daru Staircase), also referred to as Escalier de la Victoire de Samothrace, is one of the largest and most iconic interior spaces of the Louvre Palace in Paris, and of the Louvre Museum within it. Named after Pierre, Count Daru, a minister of Napoleon, and initially designed in the 1850s by Hector-Martin Lefuel as part of Napoleon III's Louvre expansion, it received its current Stripped Classical appearance in the early 1930s. Since 1883, its focal point has been the Winged Victory of Samothrace, one of the highlights of the Louvre's collections.

== Background ==
The Escalier Daru is the last in a series of increasingly monumental staircases built to serve this area of the Louvre building. In 1722, as the old Queen Mother's apartment on the ground floor of the Petite Galerie was being prepared to be the residence of Mariana Victoria of Spain the betrothed of Louis XV, a staircase was built to lead directly into the Salon Carré on the upper level, dubbed Escalier de l'Infante after Mariana Victoria. Following the ending of the engagement and her return to Spain after just three years, the Salon Carré became the venue for the yearly art show of the Académie des Beaux-Arts – thus the word Salon for such shows. Visitors would use the Escalier de l'Infante to access the Salon from the Cour de la Reine, later known as Cour du Sphinx and covered with a glass ceiling in 1934.

Shortly before his death in 1780, the Louvre architect Jacques-Germain Soufflot designed a new staircase in the context of intensive planning for the creation of a public museum in the Louvre's Grande Galerie. Soufflot's design was implemented from 1781 by his successor Maximilien Brébion. The new staircase or Escalier du Salon, which replaced the Escalier de l'Infante, opened on the ground floor on the Cour de la Reine that was intended to become the entrance of the museum, and led to what is now the Salle Duchâtel on the upper floor, immediately to the north of the Salon Carré in Le Vau's wing doubling the Petite Galerie to the west.

Following the first opening of the Louvre Museum in 1793 and its reorganization under Napoleon in the early 1800s, the museum's main entrance was established further north, through the Rotonde de Mars on what is now the southeastern corner of the Cour Napoléon. To suitably lead visitors from there to the highlights of the museum's collection in the Grande Galerie, Napoleon's architects Charles Percier and Pierre Fontaine designed a monumental staircase, soon dubbed the Escalier Percier et Fontaine, that started next to the Rotonde de Mars and led straight to the Salon Carré. The structural work was completed in 1807, but the lavish decoration designed by Percier and Fontaine took many more years and was only completed under their supervision during the Bourbon Restoration.

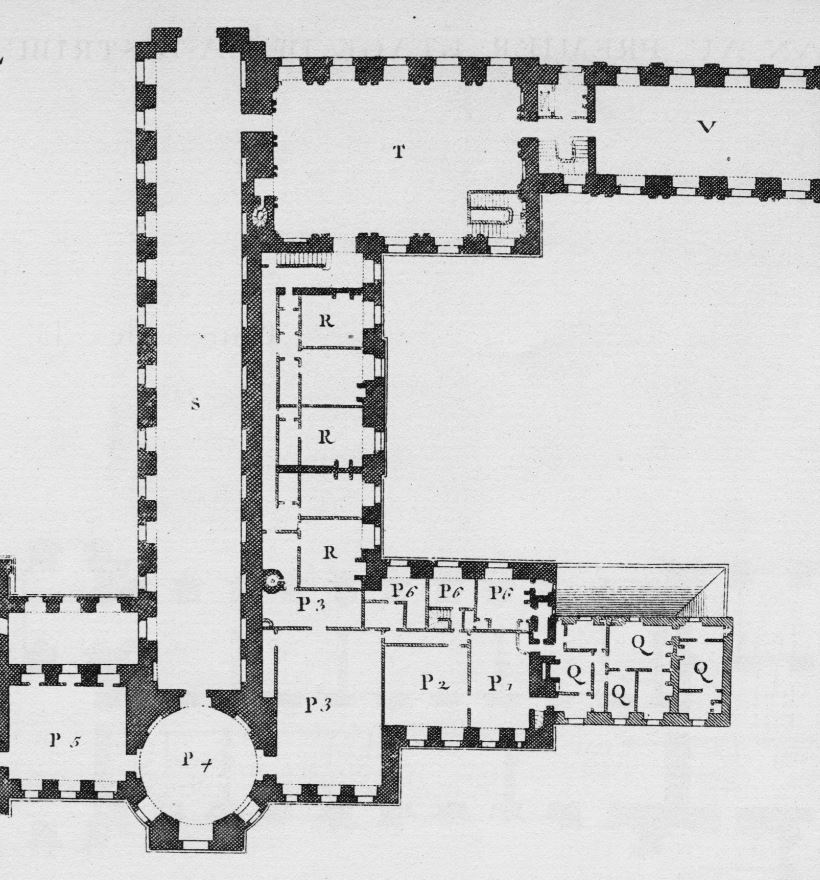
The Louvre's first floor in 1756 (Blondel plan) showing the Salon Carré (marked "T"), with the Escalier de l'Infante in its northwestern corner

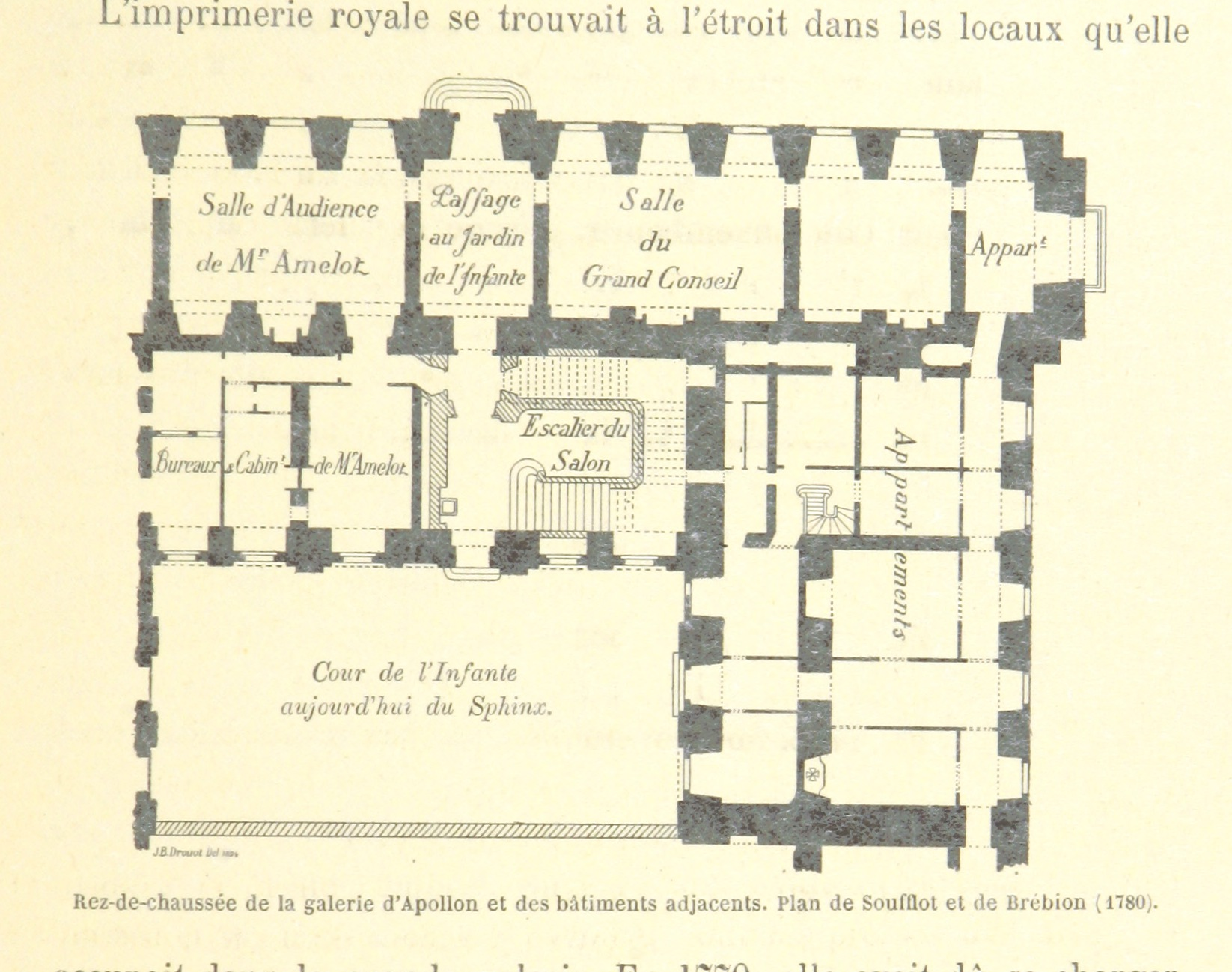
The Louvre's ground floor in 1780 (1895 reproduction) showing Brébion's Escalier du Salon

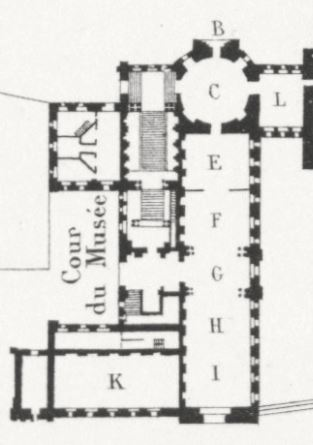
The Louvre's ground floor in 1836 (by Theodor Josef Hubert Hoffbauer, 1870s) showing the Escalier Percier et Fontaine flanking the Rotonde de Mars (marked "C")

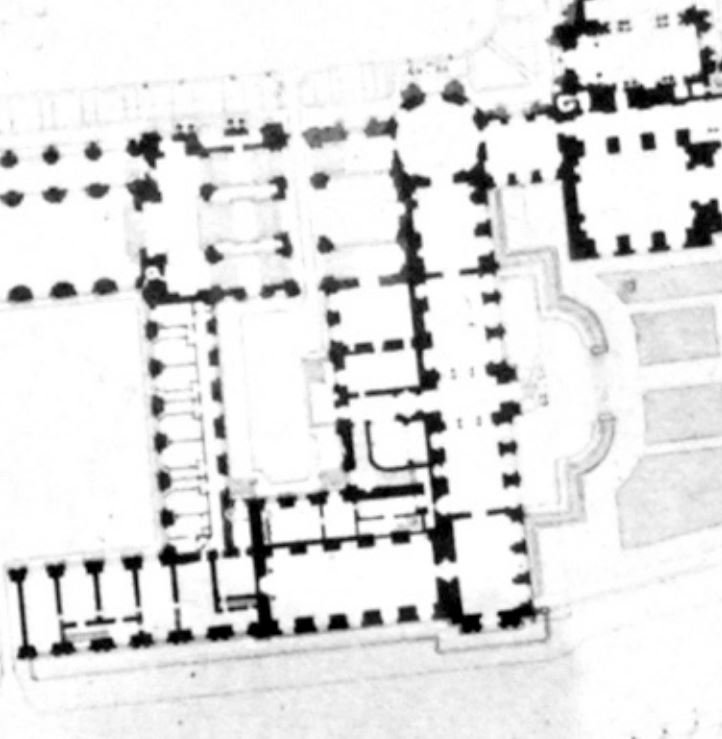
Lefuel's plan for the Escalier Daru (ground floor), photographed by Édouard Baldus

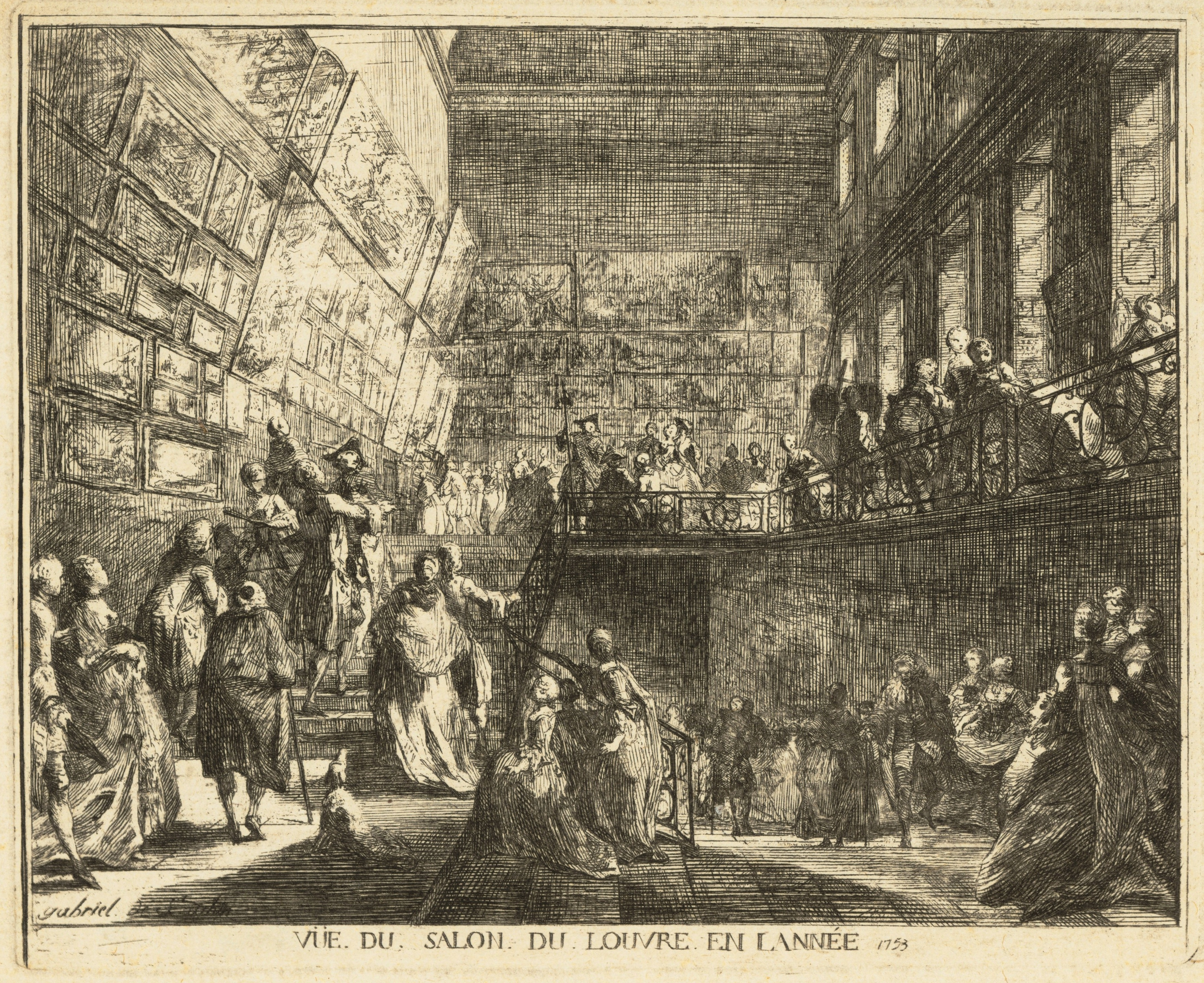
Sketch of the Salon in 1753 by Gabriel de Saint-Aubin, with visitors climbing the Escalier de l'Infante in the foreground

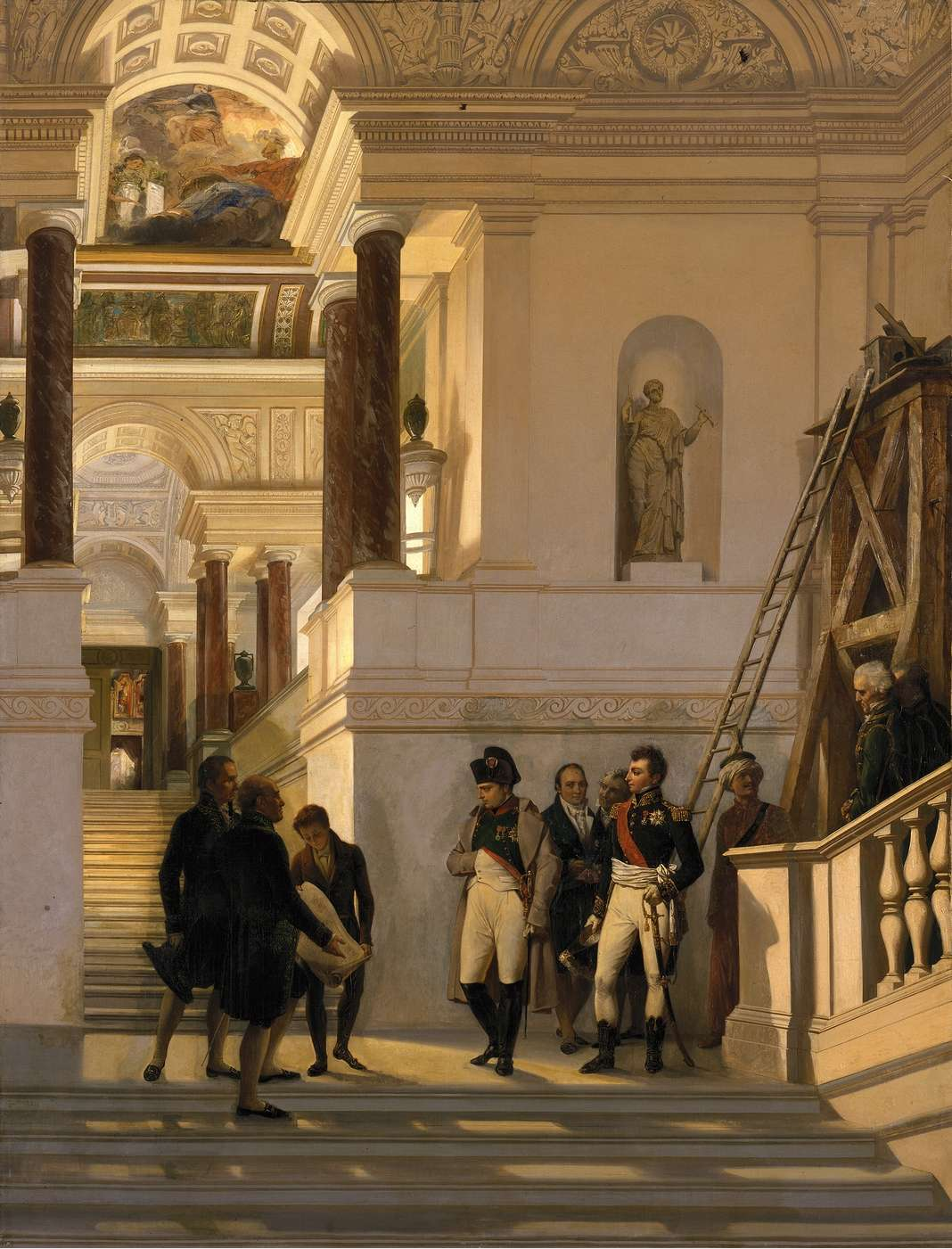
Napoleon visiting the Escalier Percier & Fontaine under construction, by Auguste Couder

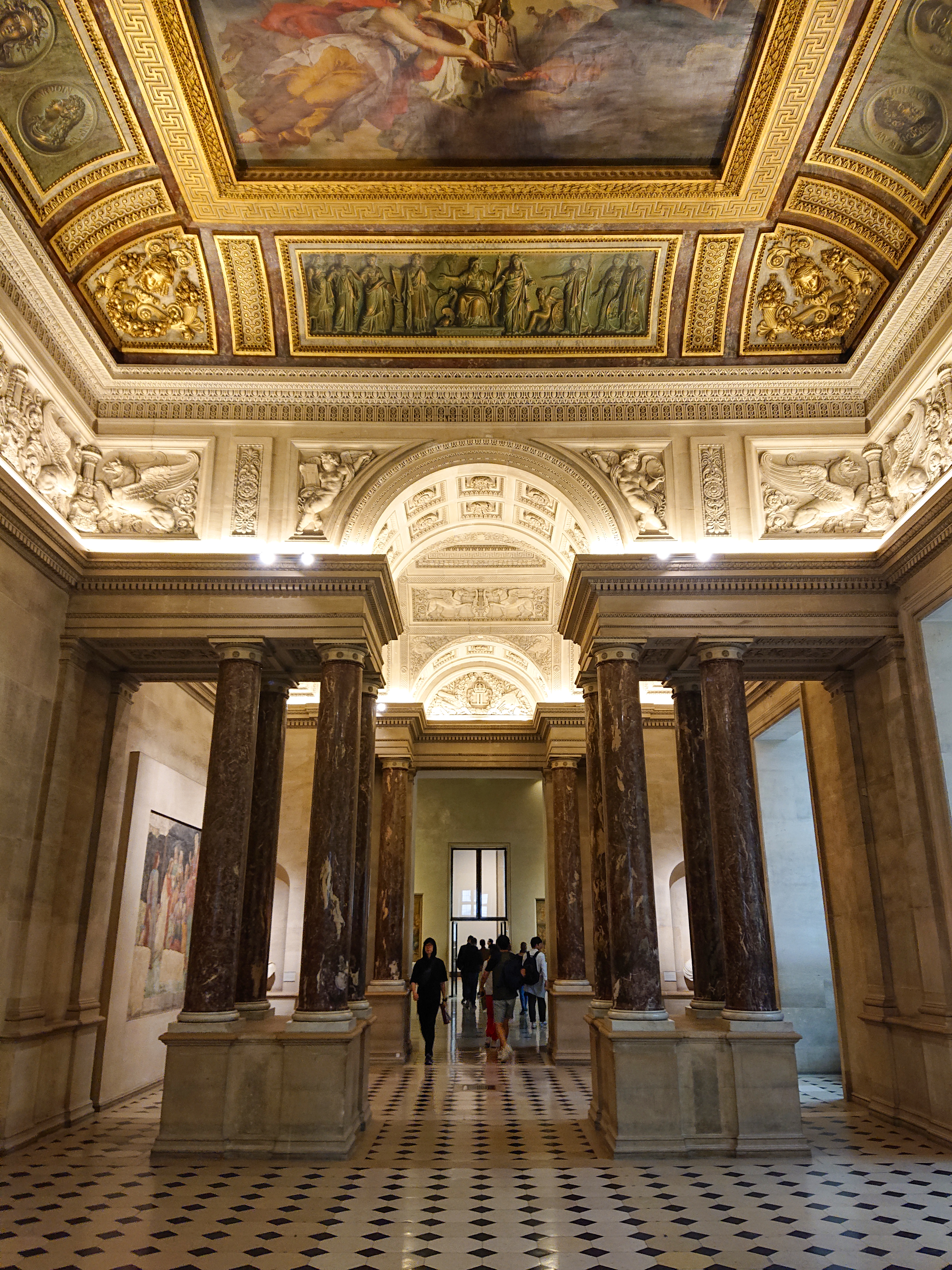
Columns and ceiling decorations of the Escalier Percier & Fontaine, preserved by Lefuel in situ in today's Salle Percier et Fontaine and Salle Duchâtel

== Lefuel's creation ==
In the context of Napoleon III's Louvre expansion, Lefuel created a new entrance for the museum, west of the earlier one, on the ground floor of the Pavillon Denon. From there, two monumental galleries led west and east and were to end with monumental staircases. At the western end, that was a new staircase named, like the gallery that led to it and the pavilion in which it stood, after Nicolas François, Count Mollien, another of Napoleon's ministers. At the eastern end, Lefuel initially wanted to keep Percier & Fontaine's staircase for its aesthetic value, but was overruled by Napoleon III or by his State Minister Achille Fould, who insisted on a new staircase aligned with the new composition. Lefuel had presented eight successive projects to preserve Percier and Fontaine's ensemble, but eventually gave up and dismantled most of it in 1865 to give way to the new one. Even so, he was able to preserve some of the ceilings and columns of Percier and Fontaine's upper level, in the first-floor rooms that are now between the Escalier Daru and the Salon Carré, now known as the Salle Percier et Fontaine.

== Later developments ==
The Escalier Daru was still unfinished at the end of the Second Empire. Its current focal point, the Winged Victory of Samothrace, was only placed at its center after Lefuel's death in 1880. The sculpture had been found in Samothrace in 1863, and shipped to Paris in 1879. It was installed in the Daru Staircase in 1883.

In 1882, Lefuel's successor Edmond Guillaume started making plans for the completion of the staircase. A team of Italian specialists created colorful mosaics for the vaulted ceilings, representing Victories holding palms and portraits of illustrious figures, on a design by painter Jules-Eugène Lenepveu.

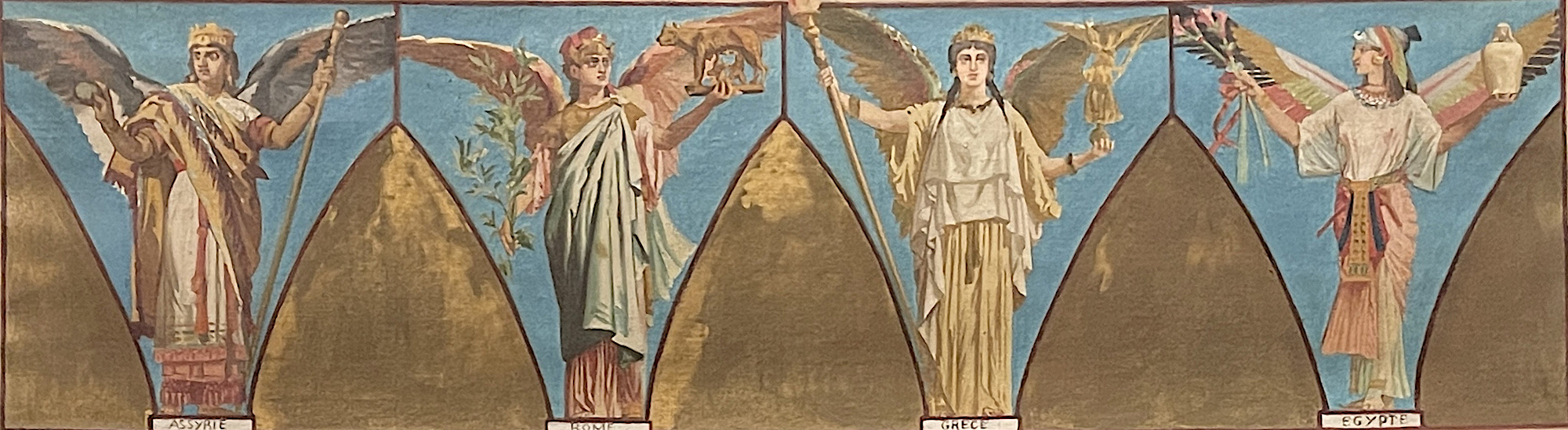
Jules-Eugène Lenepveu, La Grèce, Rome, l’Égypte et l’Assyrie, 1887–1888 (preparatory drawing for the decoration of the Escalier Daru).

The final completion was designed by the Louvre architect Camille Lefèvre and his successor from 1930 Albert Ferran, in the Art Deco style of the times, and executed in 1932–1934 as part of a broader museum modernization effort led by Louvre Director Henri Verne. Ferran covered the mosaics with stone-patterned wallpaper, broadened the stairs, and brought forward the Winged Victory to make it more prominent.

In 1997, in the third phase of the Grand Louvre project, the Escalier Daru was extended downwards to serve the newly opened gallery of Archaic Greece, in what had formerly been part of the Louvre's extensive complex of mid-19th-century horse stables.

In the early 2010s, as the Winged Victory was temporarily removed for restoration, the option of uncovering the late 19th-century mosaics was considered. But it was eventually rejected by the Louvre's curators, and the staircase was kept in its mid-1930s state.
