= Project for the Transformation of the Grande Galerie du Louvre =

Painting by Hubert Robert

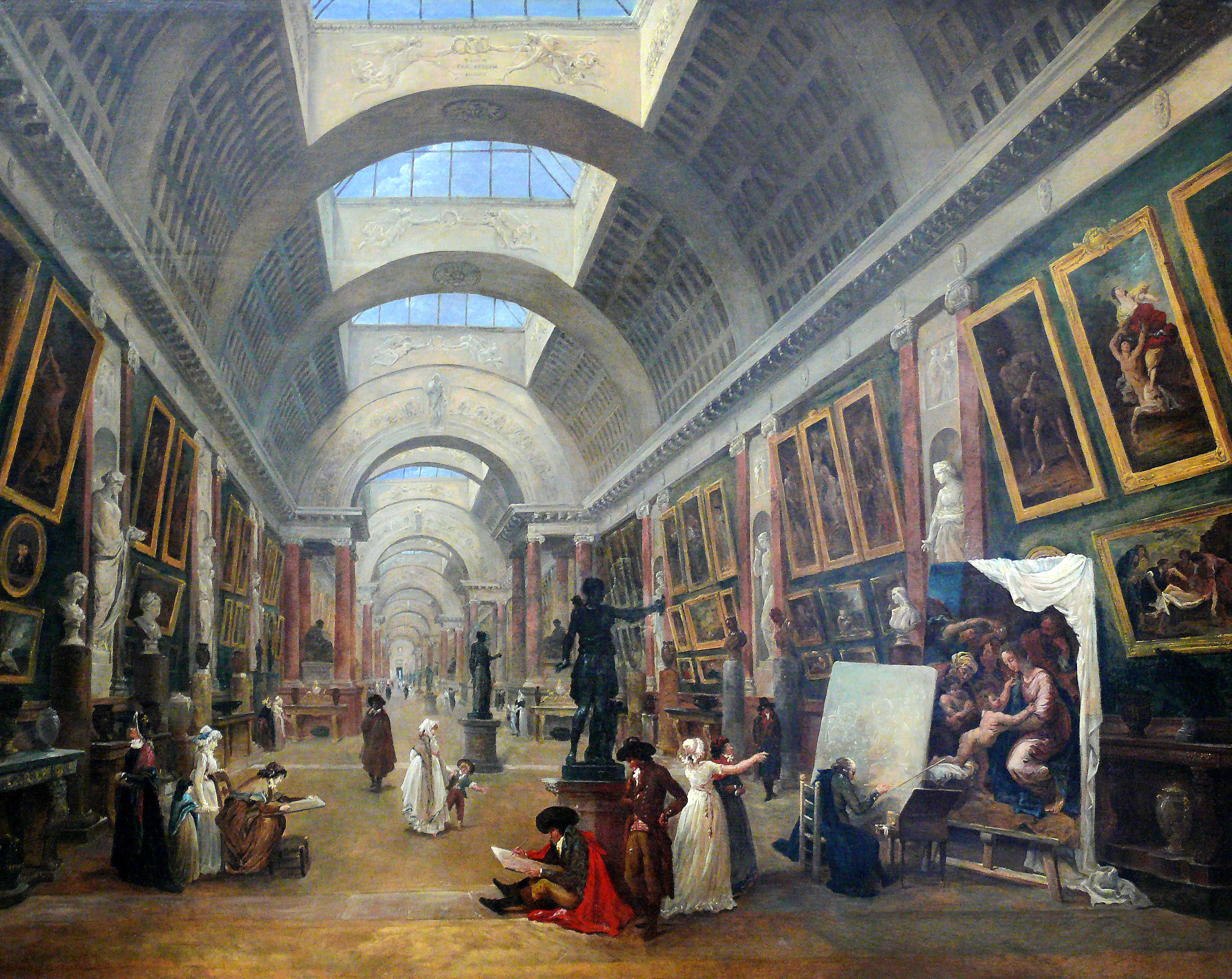
- Artist: Hubert Robert
- Year: 1796
- Medium: Oil on canvas
- Dimensions: 115 cm × 145 cm (45 in × 57 in)
- Location: Louvre, Paris

Project for the Transformation of the Grande Galerie du Louvre is an oil-on-canvas painting by the French painter Hubert Robert, made in 1796. It is held at the Louvre, in Paris. The Louvre acquired the painting in 1975; it is exhibited in the Sully wing, of the French paintings.

== History and description ==
The project for a museum for the Louvre Palace began in the last quarter of the 18th century. The first paintings were deposited there from the Palace of Versailles, in 1785. The museum opened during the French Revolution in 1793; it only included a few hundred works, that were exhibited in the Grande Galerie along the Seine.

The painter Hubert Robert was appointed keeper of the king's paintings in 1784 and was responsible for studying the layout of the future Grande Galerie, between 1784 and 1792, then between 1795 and 1802. For the Salon of 1796, he imagined a view of the Gallery presenting the arrangements he believed were necessary, in particular the opening of glass roofs allowing overhead lighting of the works.

The painting is an oil painting on rectangular canvas of 115 by 145 cm. It depicts in detail an imaginary view of the Grande Galerie du Louvre, in Paris. The Gallery features overhead lighting and is segmented into bays by series of double Corinthian columns and transverse arches. It contains numerous works of art: paintings displayed side by side along the walls and sculptures erected in niches framed by pilasters or in the center of the space. A few visitors are present, including several copyists.

== Other related paintings ==
Hubert Robert made several other paintings taking the Grande Galerie as a subject. They are development projects, descriptive paintings and even an imaginary view where he pictured it in ruins. He also painted two views of other parts of the Louvre: the Mars rotunda and the Arts counter. All these paintings are kept in the Louvre.
