= Grande Galerie =

Wing of the Louvre

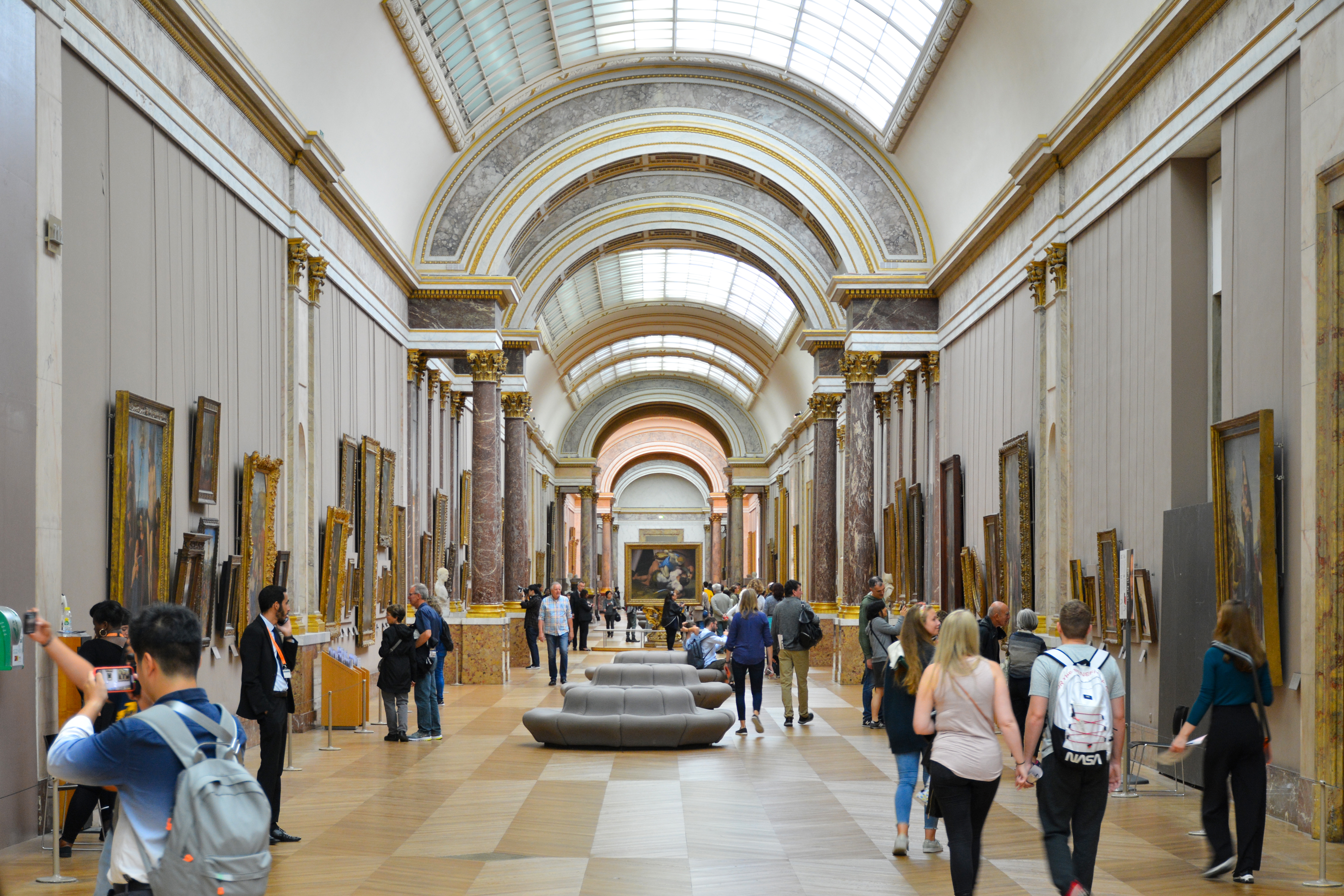
Visitors in the Grande Galerie

The Grande Galerie (French pronunciation: [ɡʁɑ̃d ɡalʁi]; Great Gallery), in the past also known as the Galerie du Bord de l'Eau (Waterside Gallery), is a wing of the Louvre Palace. It is perhaps more properly referred to as the Aile de la Grande Galerie (Grand Gallery Wing), since it houses the longest and largest room of the museum, also referred to as the Grande Galerie, one of the museum's most iconic spaces.

This unusually long wing was constructed beginning in 1595 on the initiative of King Henry IV and was completed in late 1607. It contained an elevated enclosed passageway linking the old Louvre Palace with the Tuileries Palace. The passageway was used for various purposes until the creation of the Louvre Museum in 1793, when it became the exhibition gallery it remains to this day. Originally 460 meters long, the room was reduced to its current length of 288 meters following the remodeling of its western section in the 1860s in the wake of Napoleon III's Louvre expansion.

== Pre-museum history ==
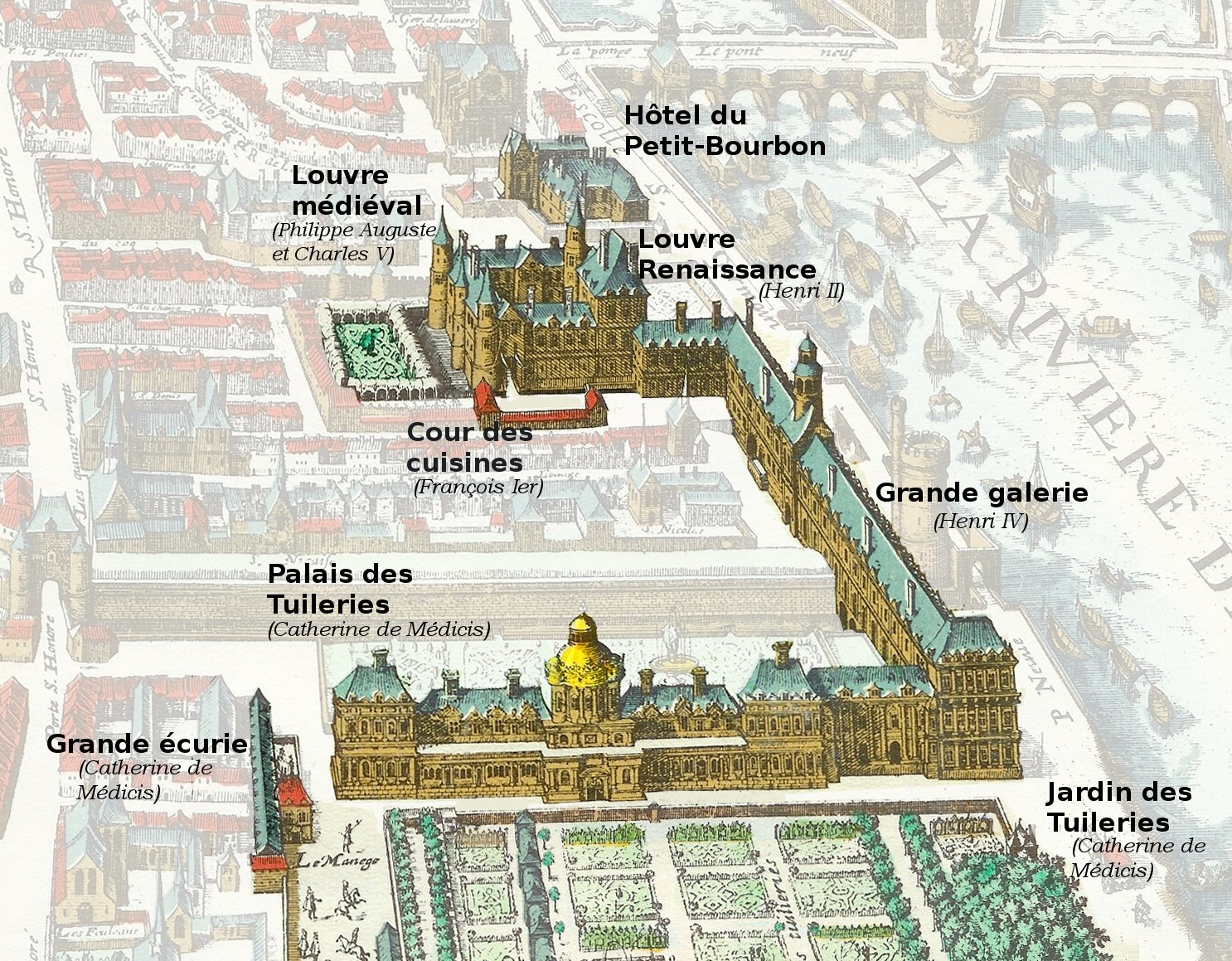
The Grande Galerie on the Merian map of Paris, 1615

Henry IV directed the building of the gallery, which started in 1595. It may have been inspired by the Vasari Corridor in Florence, designed and built in 1565 by Giorgio Vasari for Duke Cosimo I de' Medici, which connects the Uffizi with the Palazzo Pitti. The entire wing was completed in 1607. The gallery is 13 meters wide, and was originally 460 meters long.

The eastern part was built first. The original plans specified the western part would begin after a large pavilion marking the location of the wall of Charles V, but this was changed in 1603, when construction of the western part began at the midpoint between the two ends, the Petite Galerie in the east and the Pavillon de Flore in the west. The midpoint was marked with the Pavillon de la Lanterne (today's Pavillon de Lesdiguières), which was originally designed to match the south façade of the Petite Galerie at the eastern end. Further west, the location of the moat of Charles V's wall was indicated by a bay widened by two niches.

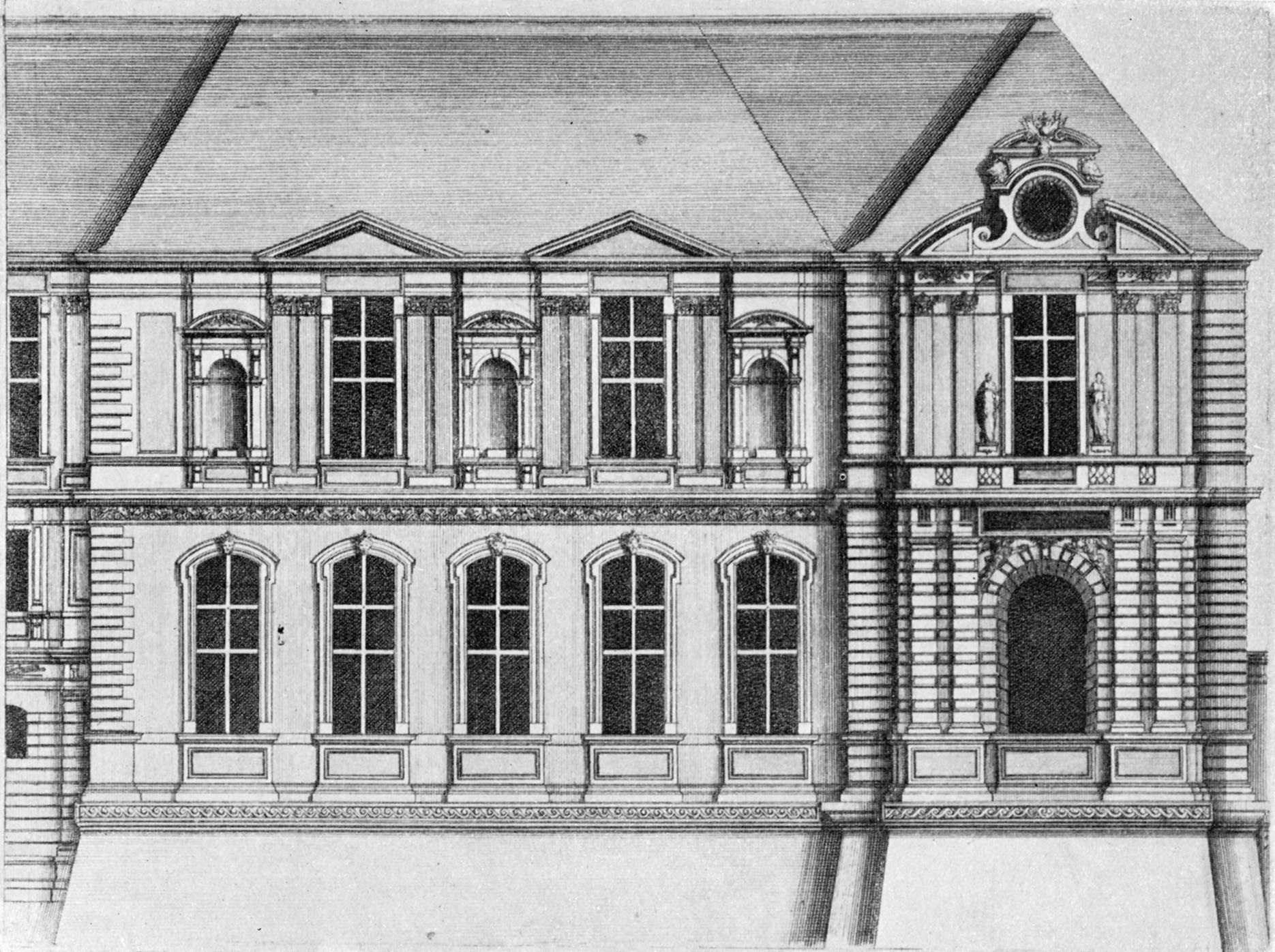
The south façade of the eastern 5-bay pavilion before 1661, as designed by Louis Métezeau, and the adjacent Petite Galerie, engraving by Jean Marot

The design of the eastern half is traditionally attributed to Louis Métezeau. The ground and intermediate (entresol) floors of the eastern half were soon devoted to artists' dwellings and workshops, by royal authorization in 1608.

The design of the western half is attributed to Jacques II Androuet du Cerceau, who decorated it with a giant order of coupled pilasters framing two floors of windows. The original design called for the ionic order, but this was changed in 1603 to the composite order with sculpted dolphins celebrating the 1601 birth of the Dauphin, the future Louis XIII. The dolphin order was also used for Henri IV's additions to the Cour Ovale at the Palace of Fontainebleau.

On the southern side, Jacques Lemercier commissioned Nicolas Poussin in 1641 to decorate the ceiling of the Grande Galerie, but Poussin returned to Rome in 1642 leaving the work unfinished.

In 1661, a fire destroyed the Petite Galerie, which linked the Grande Galerie with the Cour Carrée, and the adjacent 5-bay pavilion containing the Grand Salon at the eastern end of the Grande Galerie. Louis Le Vau reconstructed the Petite Galerie with the Galerie d'Apollon and the Grand Salon as the Salon Carré, raising the 5-bay pavilion by one storey.

The south (river) façade of the Aile de la Grande Galerie, c. 1670

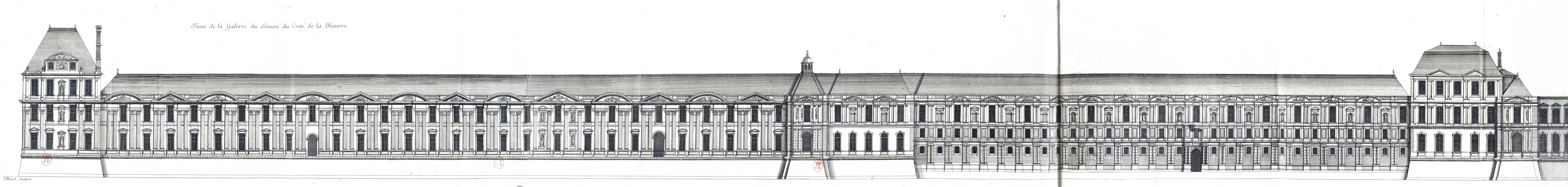
From left to right: the Pavillon de Flore, the western section designed by Jacques II Androuet du Cerceau, the Pavillon de la Lanterne, the eastern section designed by Louis Métezeau with two 5-bay pavilions at either end, and the south end of the Petite Galerie. (From a single print from the Grand Marot, published in 1686. The print shows the wing as modified by Louis Le Vau after 1661.)

In the 17th century the Grande Galerie was the theater of the "touching" ceremony, four times a year, in which the king was reputed to miraculously cure victimes of scrofula by simply touching them and pronouncing the ritual words "God heal you, the king touches you" (French: Dieu te guérisse, le roi te touche).

From 1697 on, the French state's collection of plans-reliefs was stored in the Grande Galerie, of which it occupied all the space by 1754 with about 120 items placed on wooden tables. This was not intended as an artistic exhibition but served a military purpose, as the plans-reliefs were used to study and prepare defensive and offensive siege operations of the fortified cities and strongholds they represented. The plans-reliefs were removed in 1777 to the Hôtel des Invalides, where most of them are still displayed in the Musée des Plans-Reliefs.

== Louvre Museum ==
During the reign of Louis XVI, the comte d’Angiviller promoted the use of the Grande Galerie as a public museum, tasked Hubert Robert with preparing it, and had some paintings transferred there from Versailles in 1785. But the gallery was only opened to the public after the start of the French Revolution, as the Muséum central des arts opened on 10 August 1793. Together with the Salon Carré it became the core of the Louvre's exhibition spaces, soon enlarged to the Galerie d'Apollon (1797) and the ground-floor summer apartment of Anne of Austria (1800), and later expanded into the wings around the Cour Carrée.

Hubert Robert, after being appointed the museum's first "keeper of paintings", projected to improve the lighting of the gallery, by sealing its windows and opening skylights in its vaulted ceiling. This innovative plan was realized between 1805 and 1810 by Percier and Fontaine, albeit in altered form with lateral skylights at regular intervals. Percier and Fontaine also created nine subdivisions of the long room, separated by groups of columns arranged in the manner of Venetian windows as Robert had imagined.

Paintings of the Grande Galerie by Hubert Robert

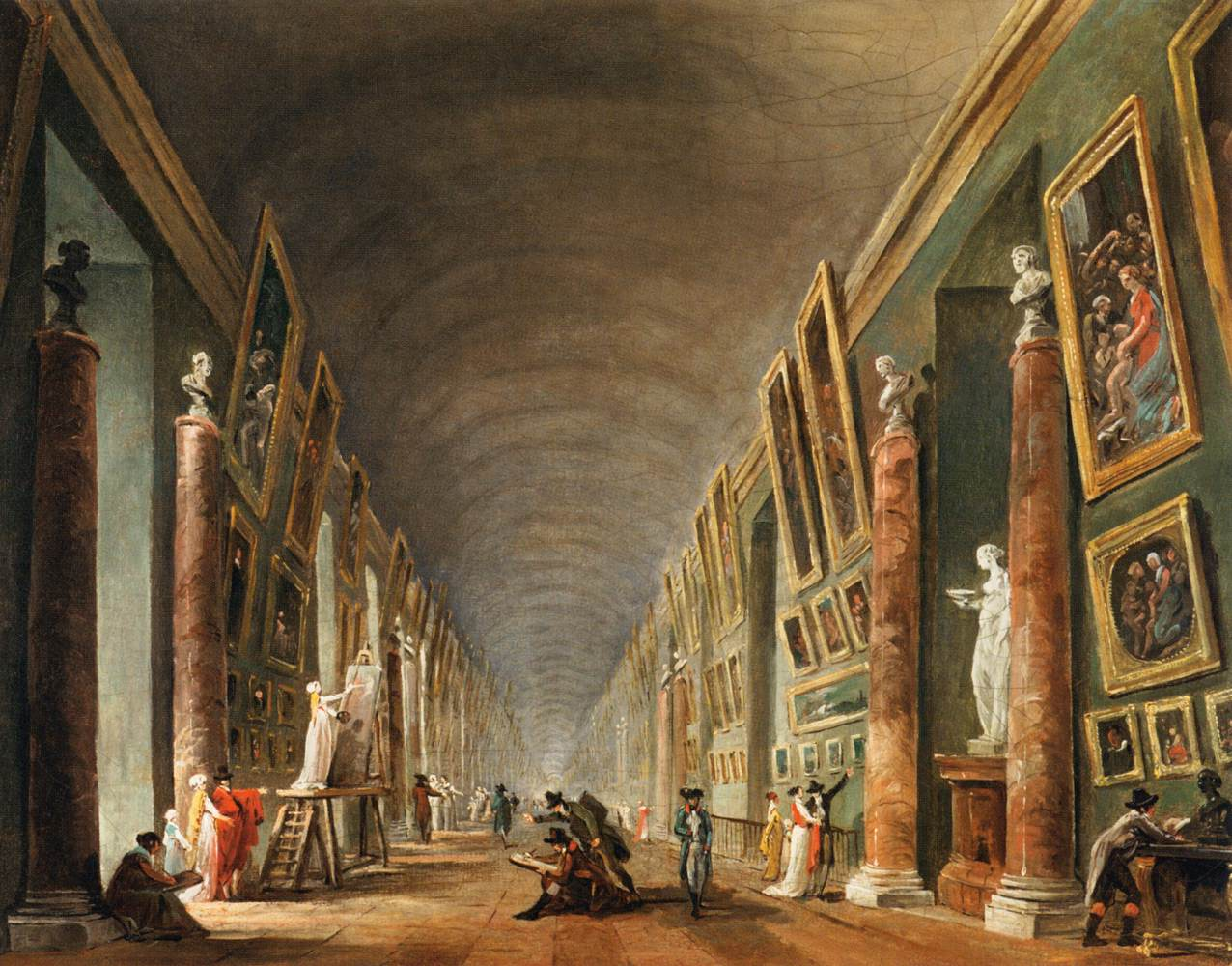
Grande Galerie during the Louvre's early years, by Hubert Robert

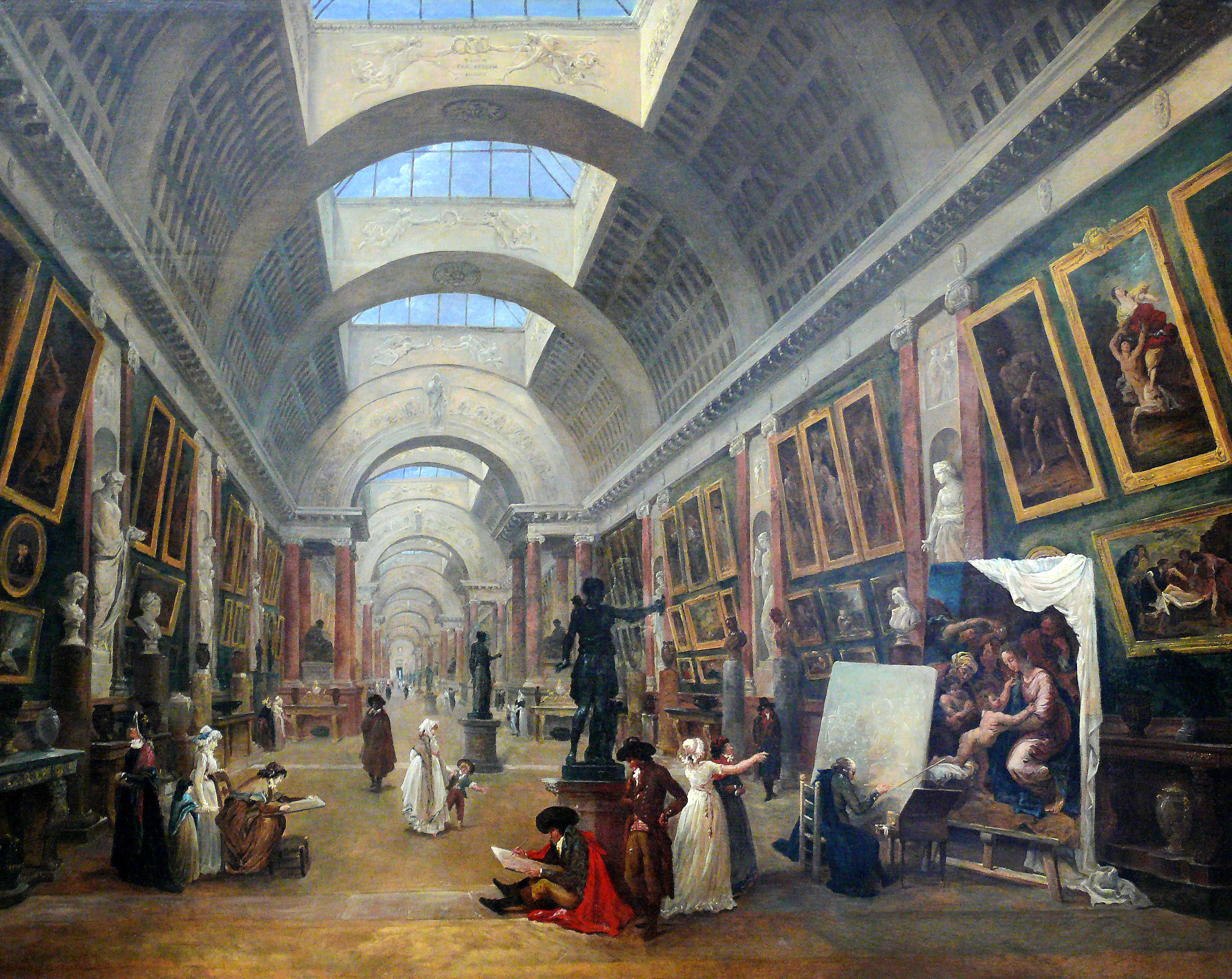
1796 project for the gallery's skylights

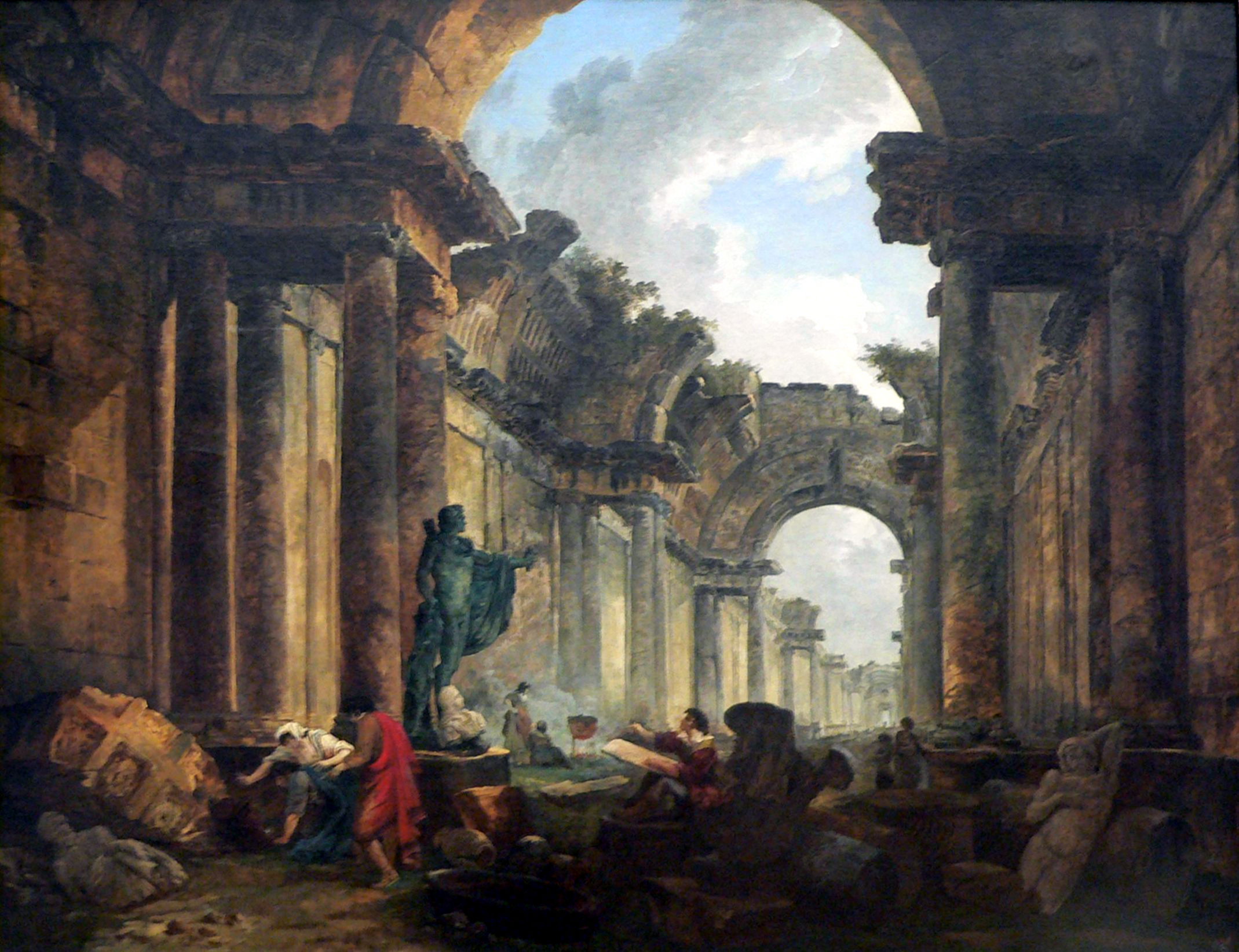
Grande Galerie in ruins, imagined by Robert (1796)

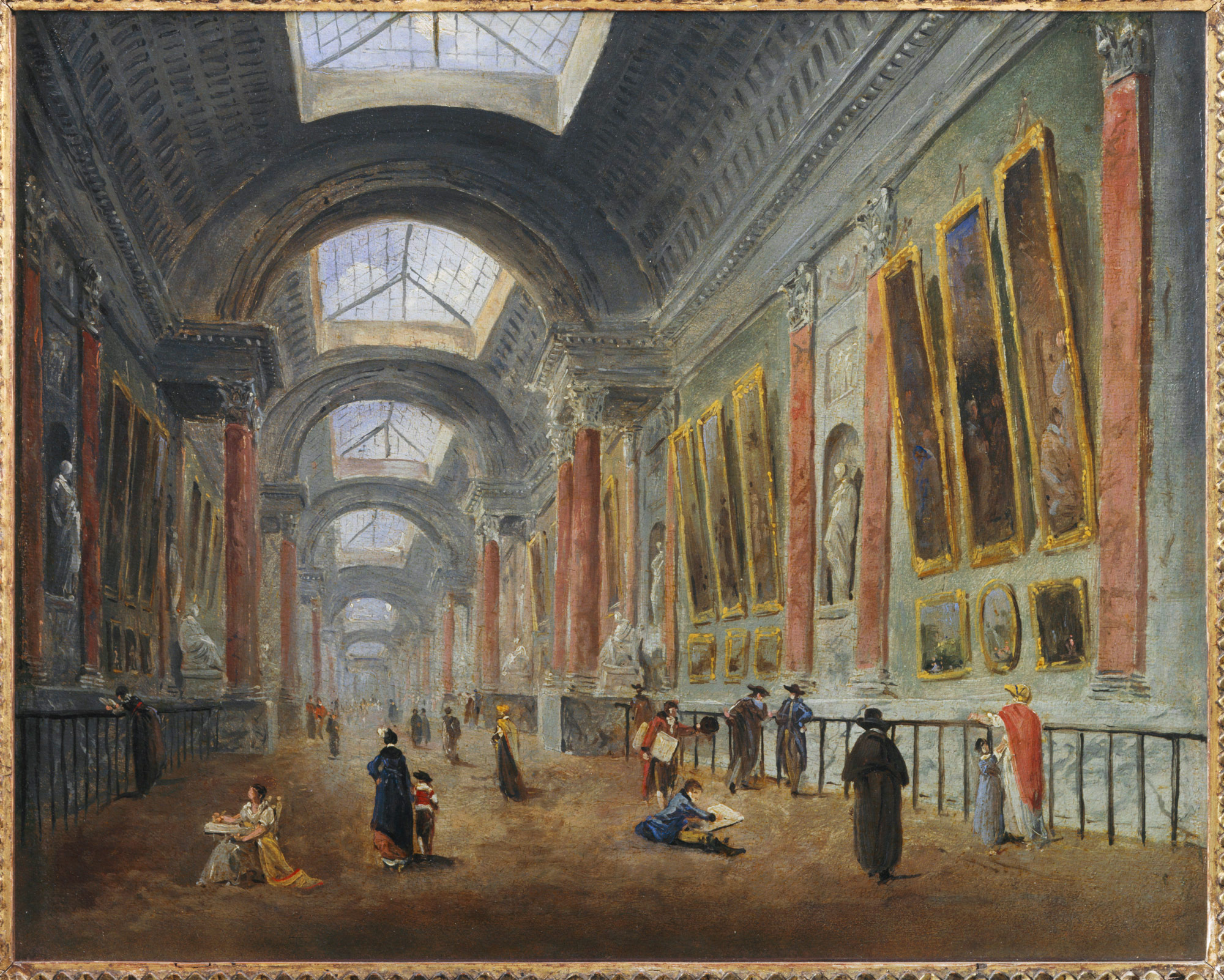
Another sketch for the gallery's skylights

On 2 April 1810, Napoleon and Marie Louise of Austria led a procession from the Tuileries throughout the Grande Galerie on the occasion of their wedding, which was celebrated in the Salon Carré, temporarily converted into a chapel.

In 1849–1851, the exterior façade of the Eastern section of the Grande Galerie was renovated by architect Félix Duban, who replaced most of the stonework even though he scrupulously respected most of the original design. Duban replaced a former passageway, the guichet de la rue des Orties, with a monumental entrance initially called porte de la Bibliothèque, later renamed porte Barbet de Jouy.

19th-century views of the Grande Gallerie

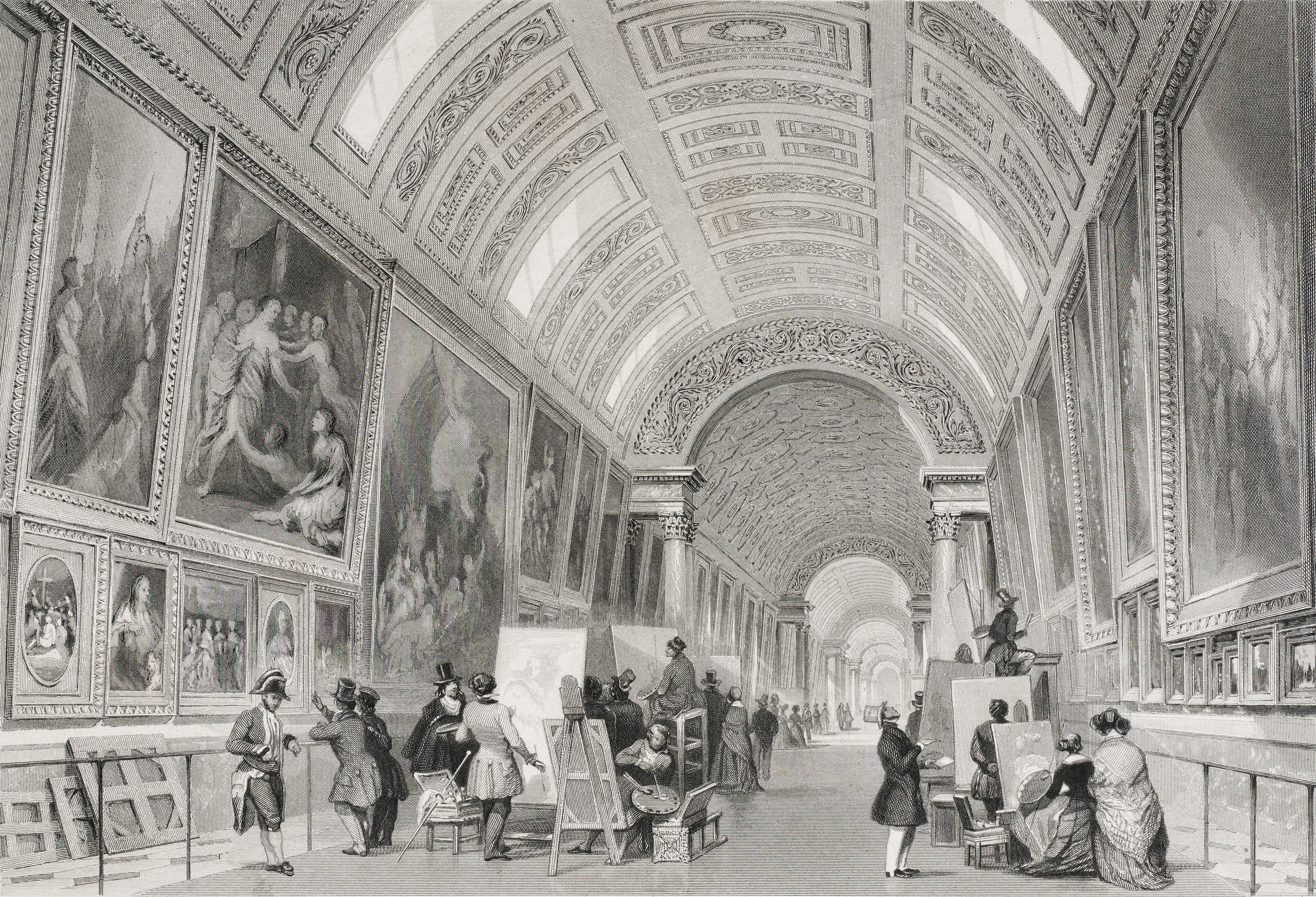
Grande Galerie in the 1840s, by Thomas Allom

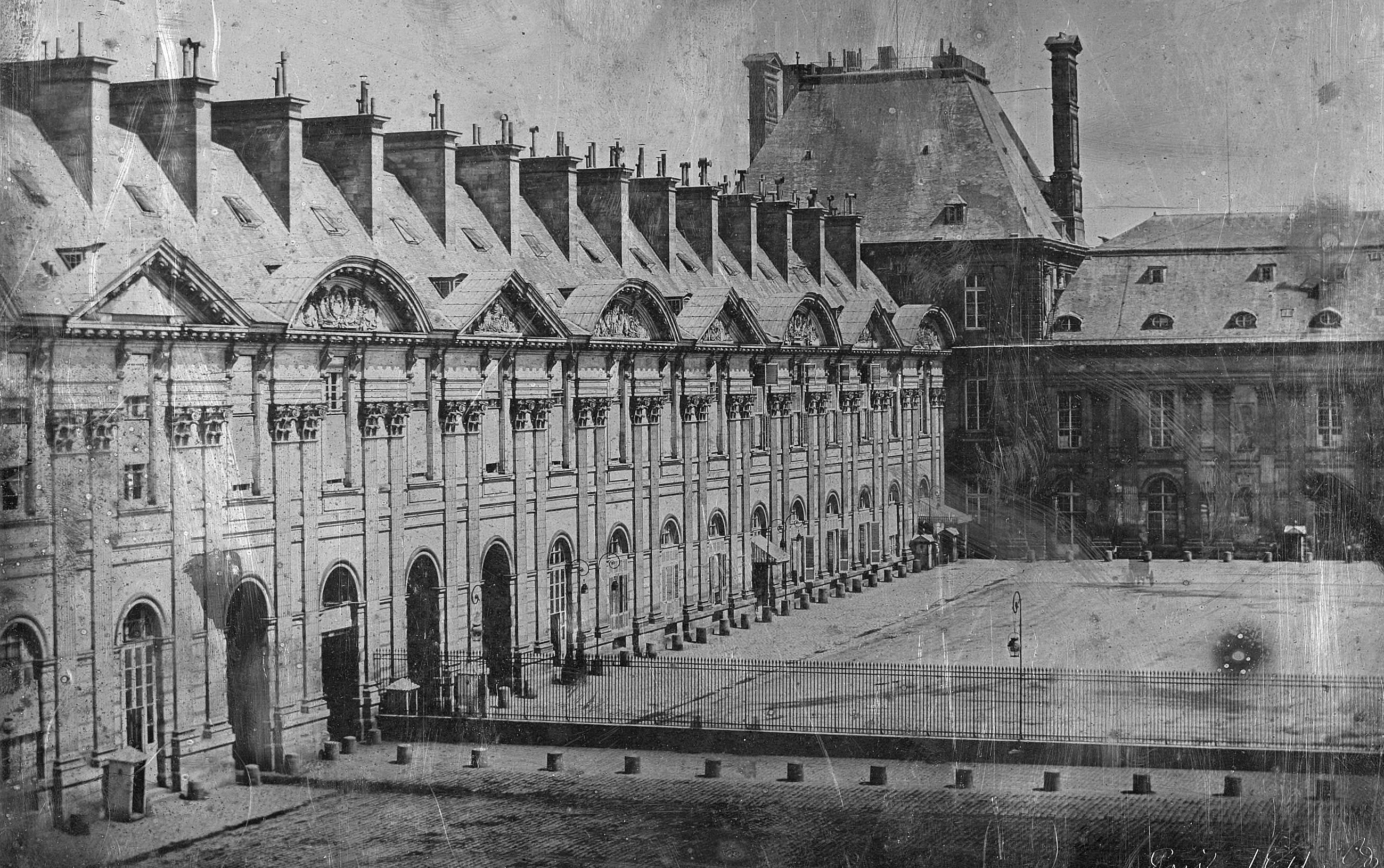
North facade of the western Grande Galerie in 1841, photo by Joseph-Philibert Girault de Prangey

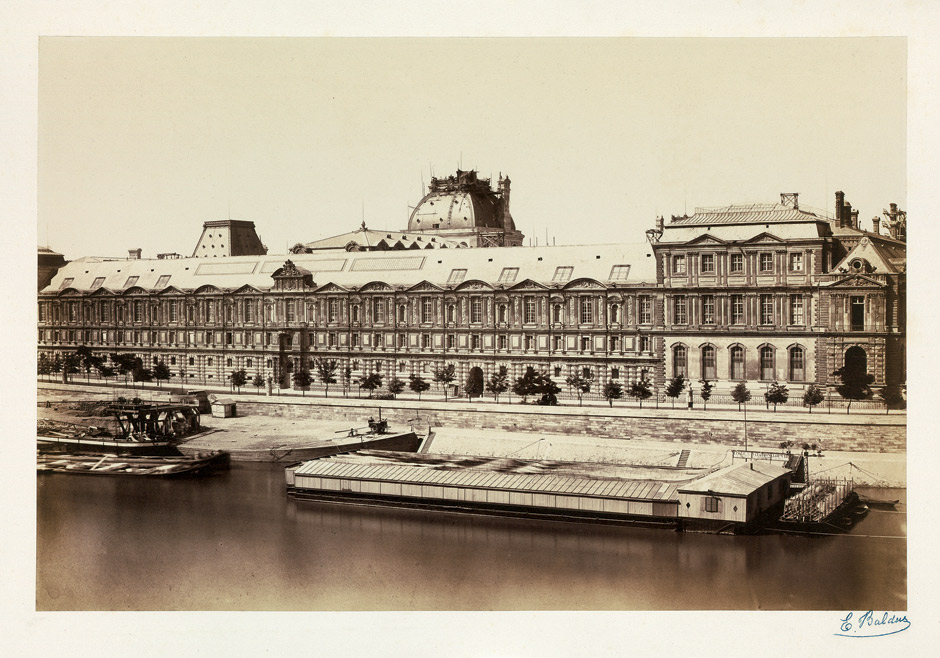
River façade of the Grande Galerie in an 1855 photo by Édouard Baldus

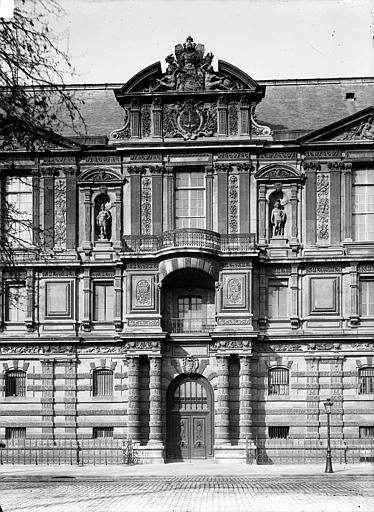
Porte Barbet-de-Jouy in 1890

In the 1860s, the Louvre's architect Hector-Martin Lefuel remodeled the southwestern wing of the Louvre Palace and created a new venue for state ceremonies, the Salle des Sessions, close to the Tuileries Palace where Emperor Napoleon III had his Paris residence. Lefuel cut the Grande Galerie short, reducing it by about a third of its original length, to make space for the new room. Since that room was broader than the gallery, it resulted in a protruding structure on the northern side, the Pavillon des Sessions. The building was entirely demolished west of the Pavillon Lesdiguières, as was the Pavillon de Flore at its western end, and rebuilt to the new plan and new exterior designs that replaced the previous giant order, which Lefuel disliked, with a replica of Métézeau's façade pattern further east. Lefuel also created the current skylight system at the center of the gallery's ceiling. The new ceilings of the gallery below the Pavillon Lesdiguières and Lefuel's new Pavillon La Trémoille were adorned with paintings by Alexandre-Dominique Denuelle and stucco sculptures by Albert-Ernest Carrier-Belleuse.

Modern views of the Aile de la Grande Galerie

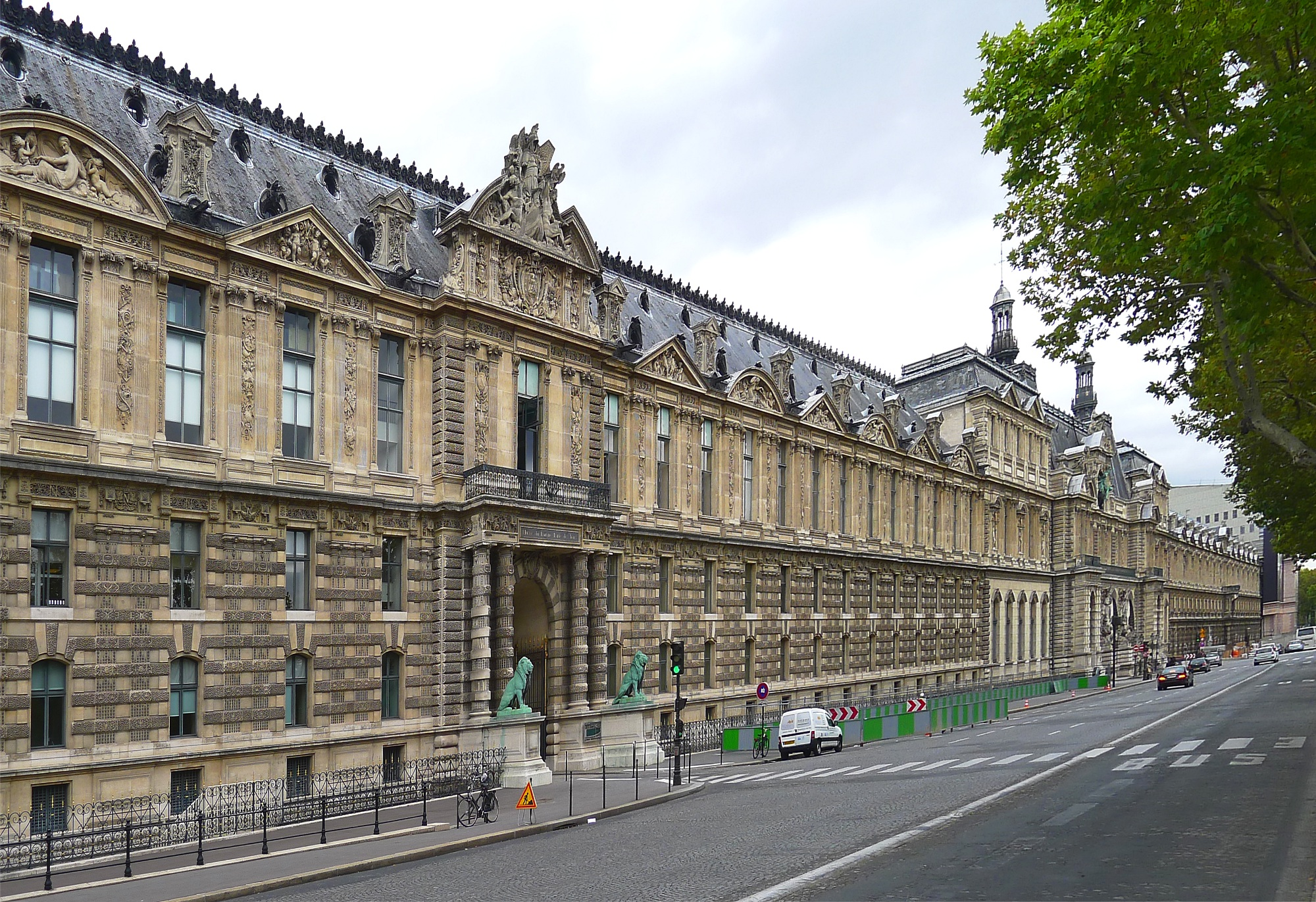
River façade looking east

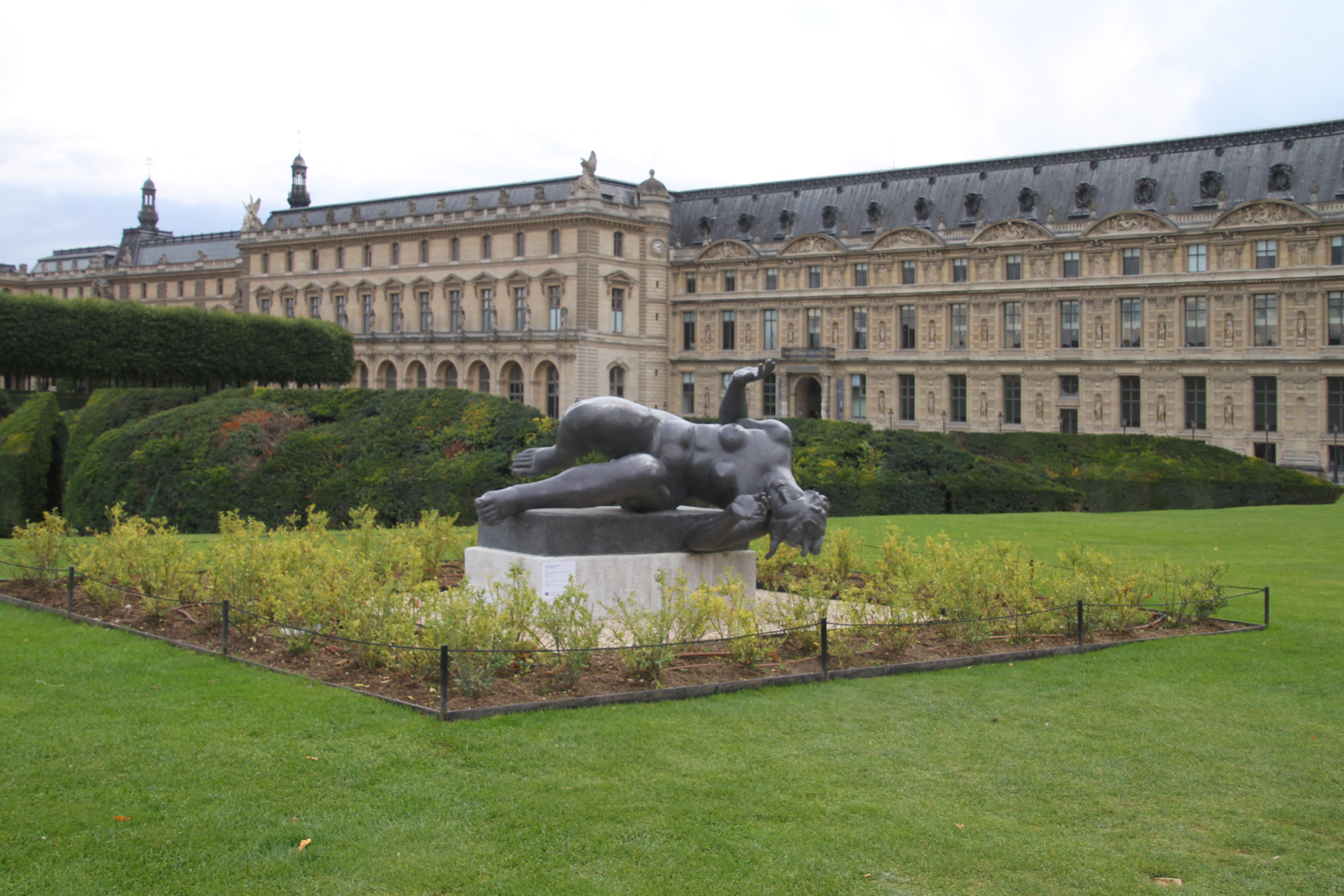
North façade with the Pavillon des Sessions

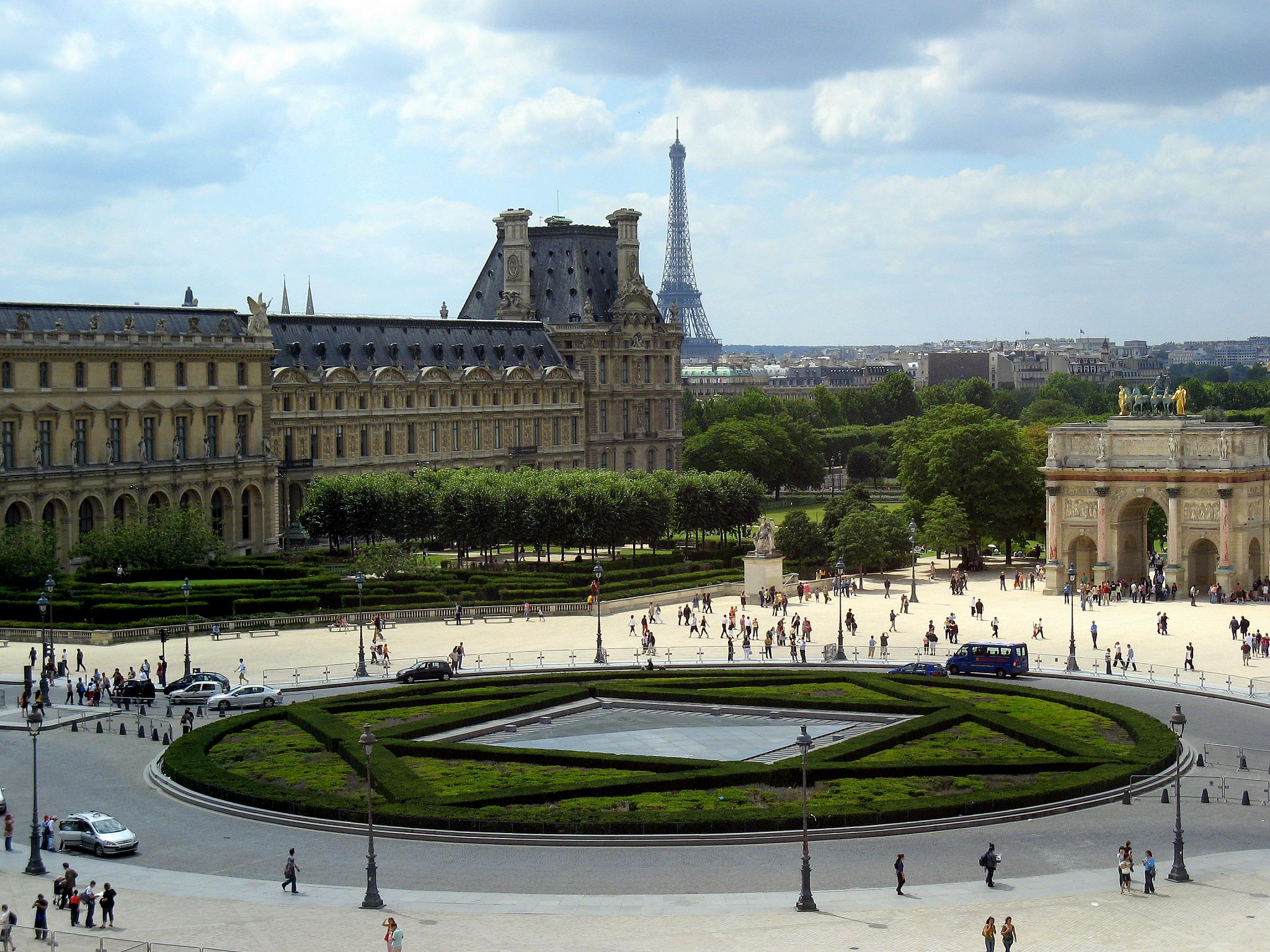
North façade viewed to the southwest

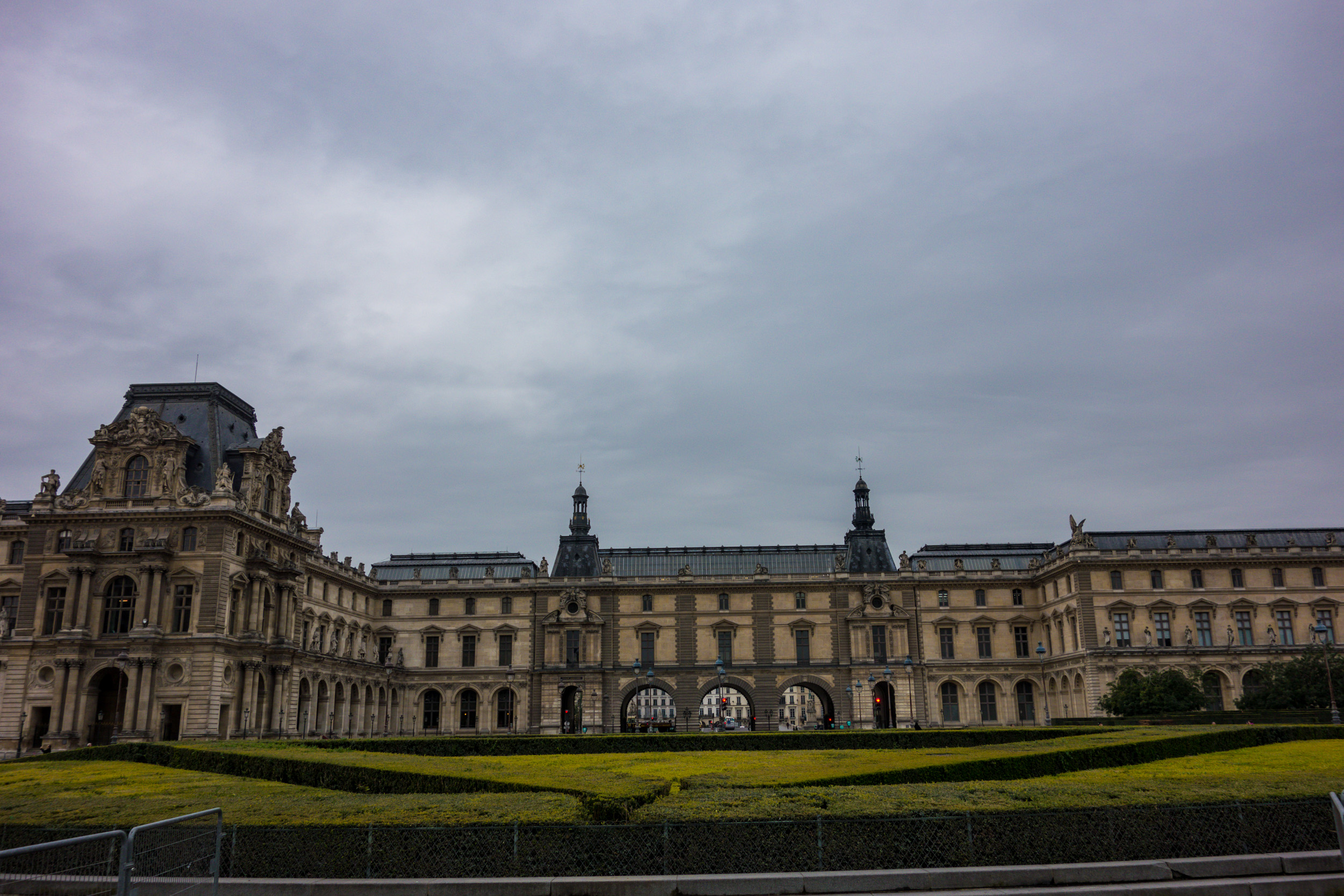
North façade of the Guichets du Louvre with the Pavillon des Sessions on the right

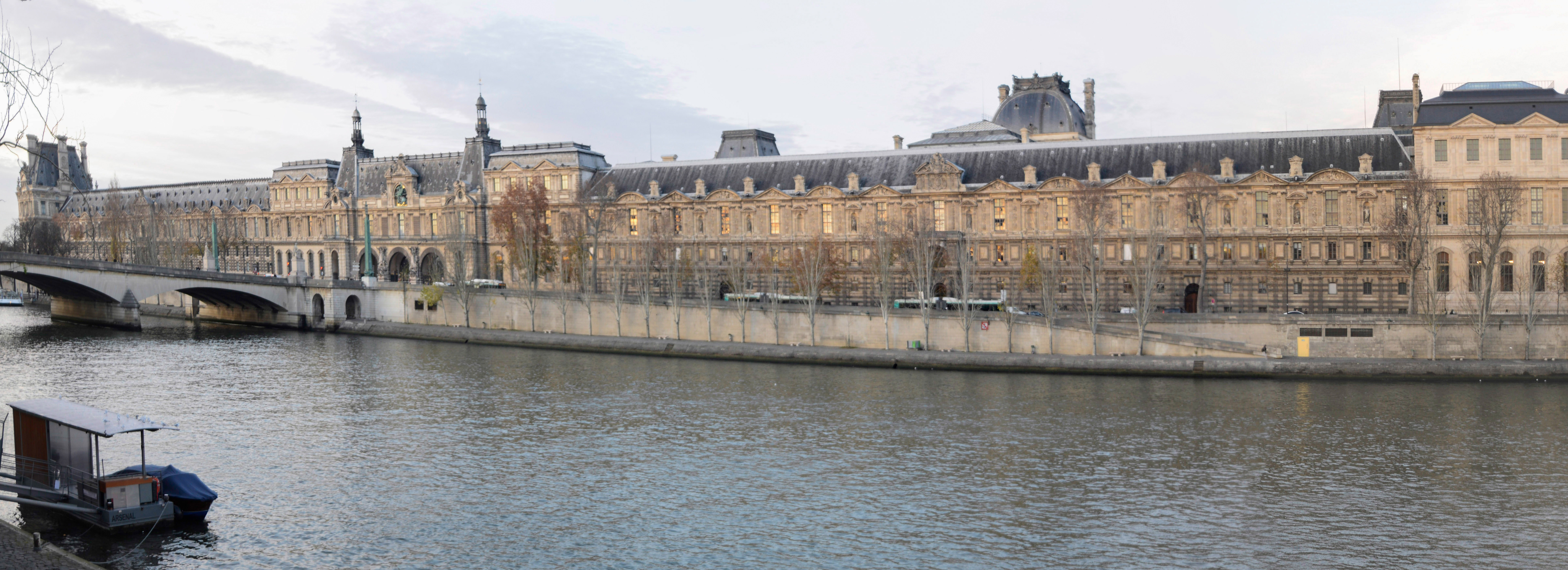
Perspective view of the river façade of the Grand Galerie, as designed by Hector Lefuel

The interior design was again streamlined around 1950 by Louvre architect Jean-Jacques Haffner. in the late 1960s, designer Pierre Paulin created new seats for the Grande Galerie. The room was refurbished during the 1990s as part of the Grand Louvre project, with no change of design but installation of air conditioning and other amenities. In the current arrangement of the Louvre's collections, the Grande Galerie is entirely devoted to the display of Italian paintings.

== Influence ==
The Grande Galerie inspired the design of the Galerie des Batailles in Versailles Palace, created under Louis-Philippe I for his Musée de l'Histoire de France. Pierre Fontaine advised Louis-Philippe's architect Frédéric Nepveu for that project's zenithal lighting. It also inspired the similar gallery of the Museo del Prado in Madrid.

== Media ==
Since 2007, Grande Galerie has also been the title of a glossy quarterly magazine published by the Louvre.

== See also ==
- Petite Galerie of the Louvre
- Galerie d'Apollon
- Salon Carré
- Escalier Daru
