= Pierre Daru =

French soldier, statesman, historian, and poet (1767–1829)

Pierre Antoine Noël Bruno Comte de Daru
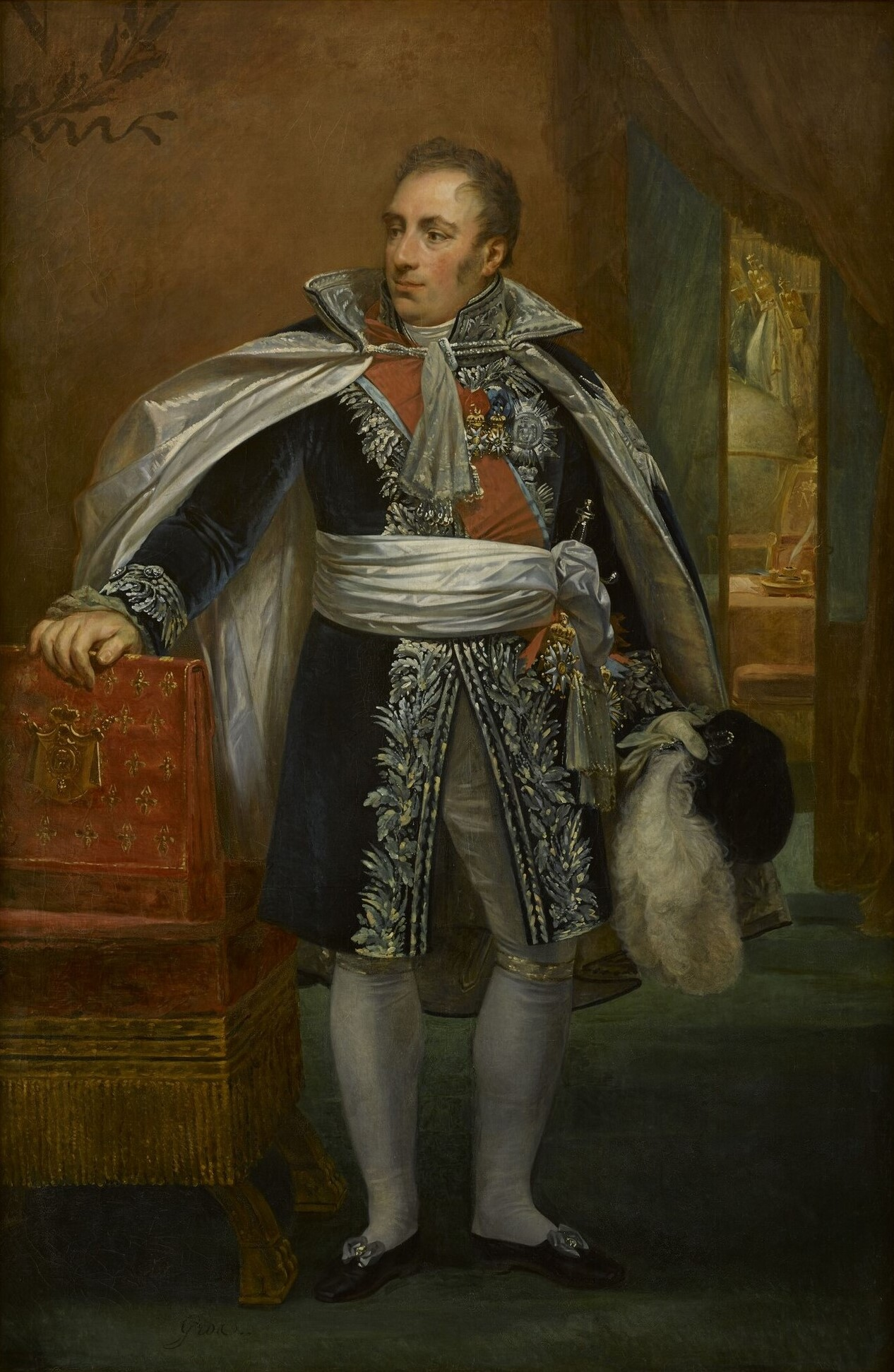

Minister of War
- In office 20 November 1813 – 1 April 1814
- Preceded by: Henri Jacques Guillaume Clarke
- Succeeded by: Pierre Dupont de l'Étang

Personal details
- Born: 12 January 1767 Montpellier, Languedoc, Kingdom of France
- Died: 5 September 1829 (aged 62) Kingdom of France

Military service
- Allegiance: First French Republic; First French Empire
- Branch/service: French Revolutionary Army; French Imperial Army
- Years of service: 1793 – 1814

Pierre Antoine Noël Bruno, Comte Daru (12 January 1767 – 5 September 1829) was a French soldier, statesman, historian, and poet.

== Early career ==
Born in Montpellier, he was educated at the Oratorian-maintained military school of Tournon, and entered artillery service at an early age. He also took an interest in literature, and he published several minor pieces, until the outbreak of the French Revolution made him concentrate on his military assignments.

In 1793 he became commissary to the army, protecting the coasts of Brittany from projected descents of the British, or of French Royalists. Thrown into prison during the Reign of Terror, on an unsubstantiated charge of friendliness to the Royalists and the British, he was released after the fall of Maximilien Robespierre in the summer of 1794 (during the Thermidorian Reaction), and rose through the ranks until, in 1799, he became chief commissary to the French Revolutionary Army serving under André Masséna in the north of Switzerland.

In that position he won repute for his organizing capacity, capacity of work and probity (the last of which qualities was contrasted with the wave of corruption). He did not however limit himself to his tasks, and found time, even during the campaign, to translate part of Horace and to compose two poems, the Poème des Alpes and the Chant de guerre – the latter was a condemnation of the murder of the French envoys to the Second Congress of Rastatt.

== Consulate and early Empire ==
The accession of Napoleon Bonaparte to power in November 1799 (the "18 Brumaire coup") led to the employment of Daru as chief commissary to the Army of Reserve intended for Northern Italy, and commanded nominally by Louis Alexandre Berthier, but really by the First Consul. Conjointly with Berthier and Dejean, he signed the armistice with the Holy Roman Empire which closed the campaign in North Italy in June 1800.

Daru now returned, for a time, mainly to civil life, and entered the tribunate of the French Consulate, where he supported the principles of democracy. On the renewal of war with Great Britain, in May 1803, he again resumed his duties as chief commissary for the army on the northern coasts. It was afterwards asserted that, on Napoleon's resolve to turn the army of Great Britain against the Habsburgs after the proclamation of the First French Empire, Daru had set down at the dictation all the details of the campaign which culminated in the battle of Ulm. The story is apocryphal, but Napoleon's confidence in him is shown by his being appointed to similar duties in La Grande Armée, which in the autumn of 1805 defeated the armies of the Austrian Empire and Russia. After the battle of Austerlitz, he took part in the drafting of the Treaty of Pressburg.

== Prominence ==
At this tune, too, he became intendant-general of the military household of Napoleon. In the campaigns of 1806–1807, Daru served, in his usual capacity, in the army which overthrew the forces of Russia and Prussia; and he had a share in drawing up the Treaty of Tilsit (7 July 1807). After this he supervised the administrative and financial duties in connection with the French army which occupied the principal fortresses of Prussia, and was one of the chief agents through whom Napoleon pressed hard on that land. At the Congress of Erfurt, Daru had the privilege of being present at the interview between Johann Wolfgang von Goethe and Napoleon, and interposed tactful references to the works of the great poet.

Daru fulfilled his usual duties in the campaign of 1809 against the Austrians. Afterwards, when the issue of Napoleon's divorce from Josephine Beauharnais and the choice of a Russian or of an Austrian princess came to be discussed, Daru, on being consulted by Napoleon, is said to have boldly counselled his marriage with a French lady, and that Napoleon, who admired his frankness and honesty, was not angered by the remark. Still in 1809, he was created a count of the Empire.

In 1811 he became secretary of state in succession to Hugues-Bernard Maret, duc de Bassano, and showed his ability in the administration of the vast and complex affairs of the French Empire, including the arrangements connected with the civil list and the imperial domains. His competent administration was contrasted with the military disasters leading to the fall of the Empire. Late in 1813, he took up the portfolio of military affairs.

After the first abdication of Napoleon in 1814, Daru retired into private life, but aided Napoleon during his return (the Hundred Days). After the Second Bourbon Restoration, he became a member of the Chamber of Peers, in which he again defended the cause of democracy against the attacks of the Ultra-royalists. He died in Meulan.

His son who inherited the title is Napoléon Daru, brother of Viscount Paul Daru. Pierre Daru often appears in the autobiographical works of Stendhal, of whom he was a cousin.

== Legacy ==
Several elements of Napoleon III's Louvre expansion bear Daru's name, including the Louvre's most monumental staircase and several exhibition rooms (escalier Daru, galerie Daru, salle Daru).

== Works ==
Besides his translation of Horace, Daru was the author of:

- Histoire de la République de Venise (in 7 vols, Paris, 1819)
- Histoire de Bretagne, (3 vols, Paris, 1826)
- Discours en vers sur les facultés de l'homme (Paris, 1825)
- Astronomie (a didactic poem in six cantos; Paris, 1820)

Political offices
Preceded by Henri Jacques Guillaume Clarke	Minister of War; 20 November 1813 – 1 April 1814	Succeeded by Pierre Dupont de l'Étang
