= Petite Galerie of the Louvre =

Wing of the Louvre Palace

Coordinates: 48°51′35″N 2°20′13″E

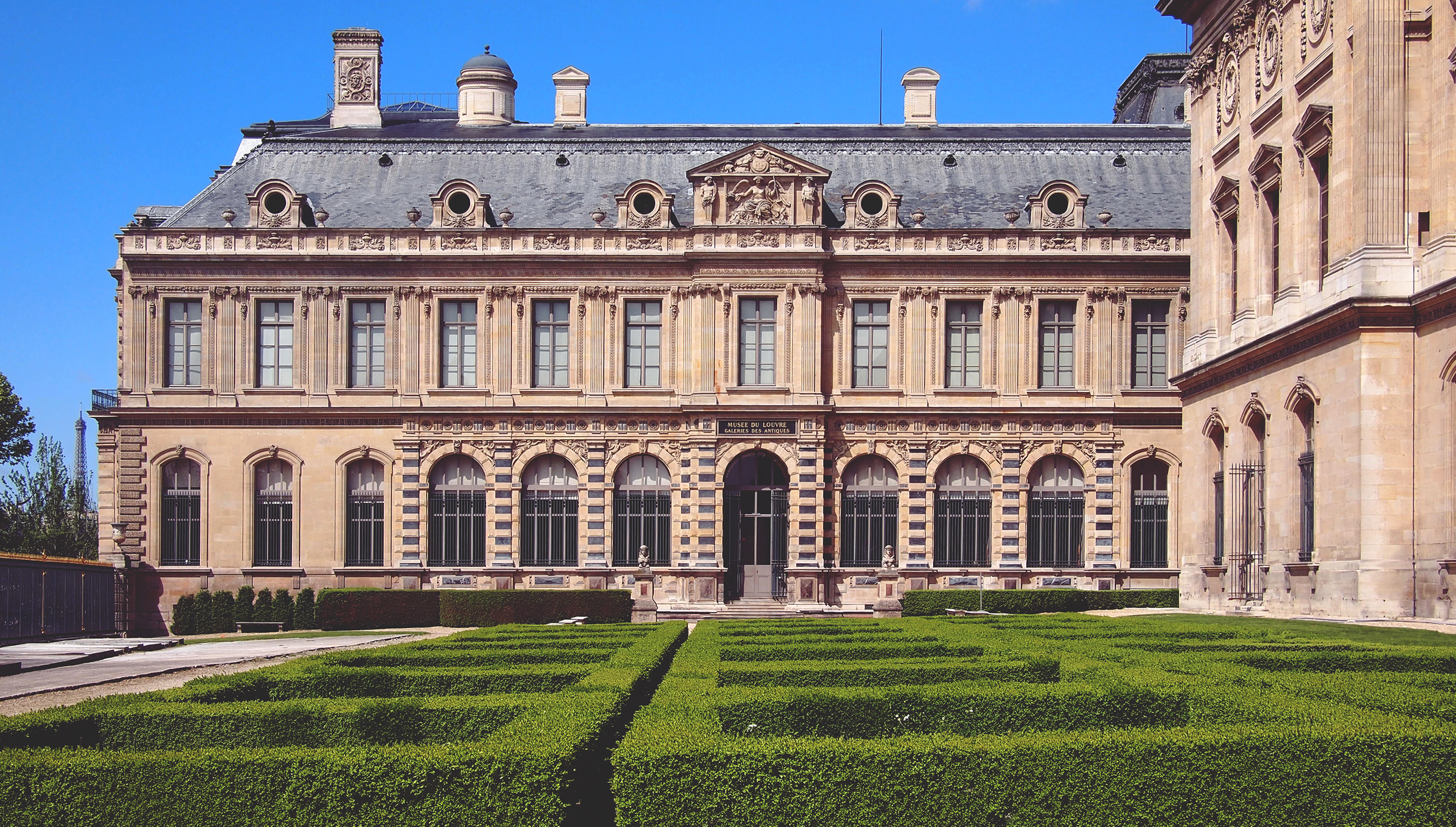
The Petite Galerie viewed from the east, photographed in 2016

The Petite Galerie is a wing of the Louvre Palace, which connects the buildings surrounding the Cour Carrée with the Grande Galerie bordering the River Seine. Begun in 1566, its current structures date mainly from the 17th and 19th centuries. Most of its main floor is now the Galerie d'Apollon, one of the Louvre's most iconic spaces.

== History ==
The foundation of the Petite Galerie was begun in 1566 under Charles IX. Jacques Androuet du Cerceau's Les plus excellents bastiments de France, published in 1576, shows a plan for a single floor, one room wide, that coincides closely with what was actually built. According to Henri Sauval, writing around 1650 but not published until 1724, the wing was one-storey high surmounted by a terrace. He credited the design to an architect named Chambiche (thought to be the stonemason Pierre II Chambiges (1545–1616)). Pierre Lescot, the architect of the Louvre at the time, is generally credited with the initial design, but construction stopped around 1568, as the Wars of Religion gathered momentum, when the walls may not have risen as high as the tops of the windows.

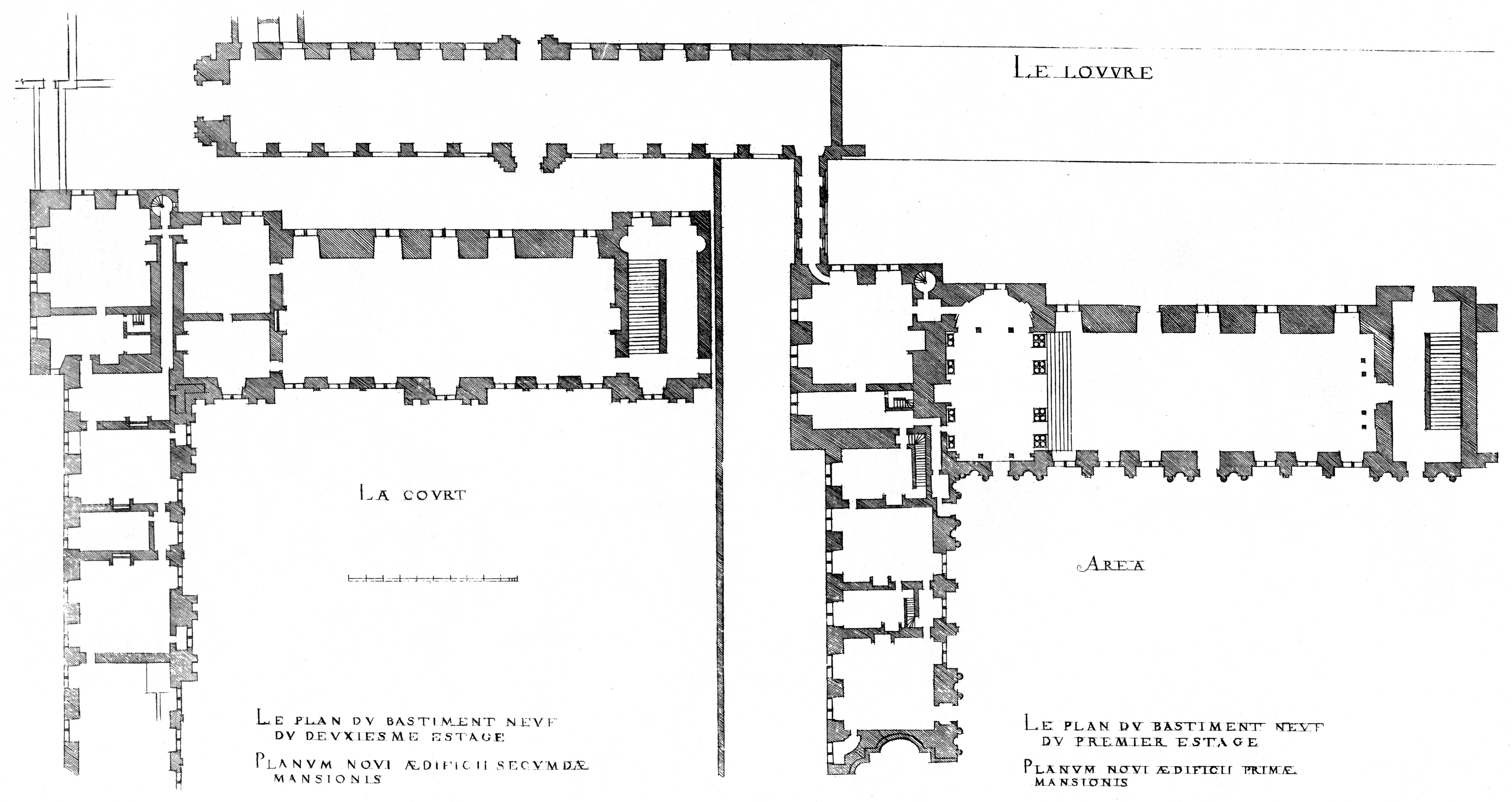
Plans of the southwest corner of the Renaissance Louvre, west at the top (1576 engraving by Jacques Androuet du Cerceau). The plan on the right shows the ground floor with the single-storey Petite Galerie at the top. The plan on the left shows the floor above the ground floor of the main part of the Louvre.

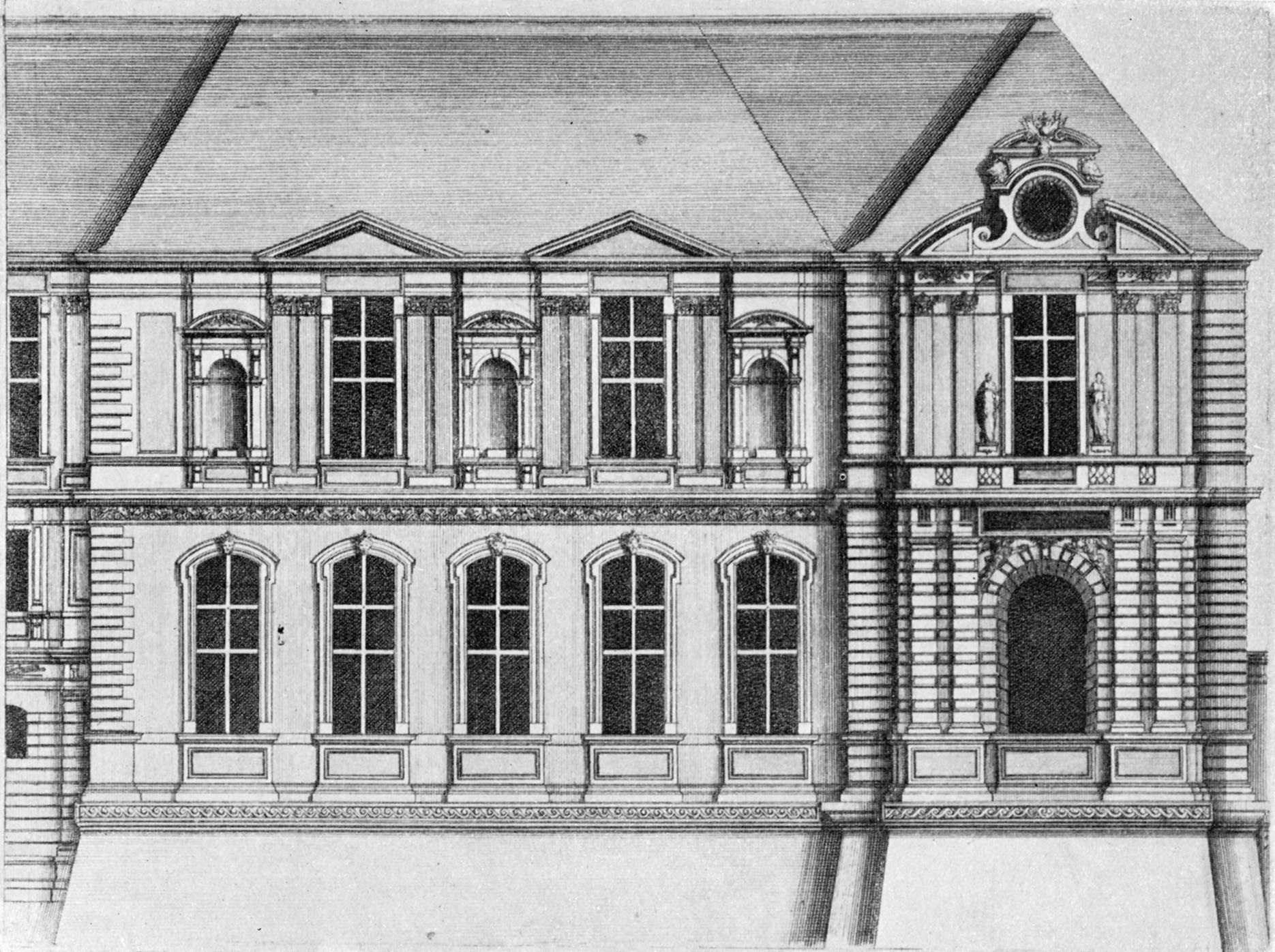
South façade of the Petite Galerie (the bay at the right end) after the addition of the second storey but before the alterations made by Louis Le Vau after the 1661 fire (engraving by Jean Marot)

In the late 16th century, during the reign of Henry IV, a second storey was added (piano nobile) consisting of a large full-length room decorated as a gallery celebrating former kings and queens of France, known as the Salle des Peintures or Galerie des Rois. A portrait of Marie de' Medici by Frans Pourbus the Younger, still in the Louvre, is a rare remnant of this series.

In the second half of the 1650s, the ground floor was lavishly decorated for Anne of Austria as her summer apartment (appartement d'été), whose ornate ceilings partly survive to this day. These rooms had previously been the venue for the King's Council.

A major fire on 6 February 1661 destroyed most of the Galerie des Rois, though not the ground floor. The gallery's exterior was rebuilt in the 1660s with a new design by Louis Le Vau, who added a parallel wing doubling the Petite Galerie to the West. Inside, the upper floor was rebuilt as the Galerie d'Apollon.

In 1849, architect Félix Duban renovated the exterior façades of the Petite Galerie, simultaneously with those of the eastern half of the Grande Galerie facing the Seine. He reversed the changes made by Le Vau and aimed at carefully restoring the designs of the time of Henry IV, based on 17-century engravings by Jean Marot. On the western side, Le Vau's façade became the eastern side of the enclosed Cour du Sphinx in the 1850s in the context of Napoleon III's Louvre expansion.

== Description ==
The exteriors of the Petite Galerie facing the Seine (south) and the Jardin de l'Infante (east) have been kept in their state as restored by Duban. Inside, the ground floor is now part of the Louvre's department of classical antiquities, and the first floor is the Galerie d'Apollon.

== Namesake exhibition space ==
In playful reference to the Grande Galerie (whose name is much more widely known to the visiting public than that of the Petite Galerie), the Louvre museum in 2015 renamed a temporary exhibition space of its Richelieu Wing as the "petite galerie", signaling its dedication to displays aimed at younger visitors.

== Gallery ==
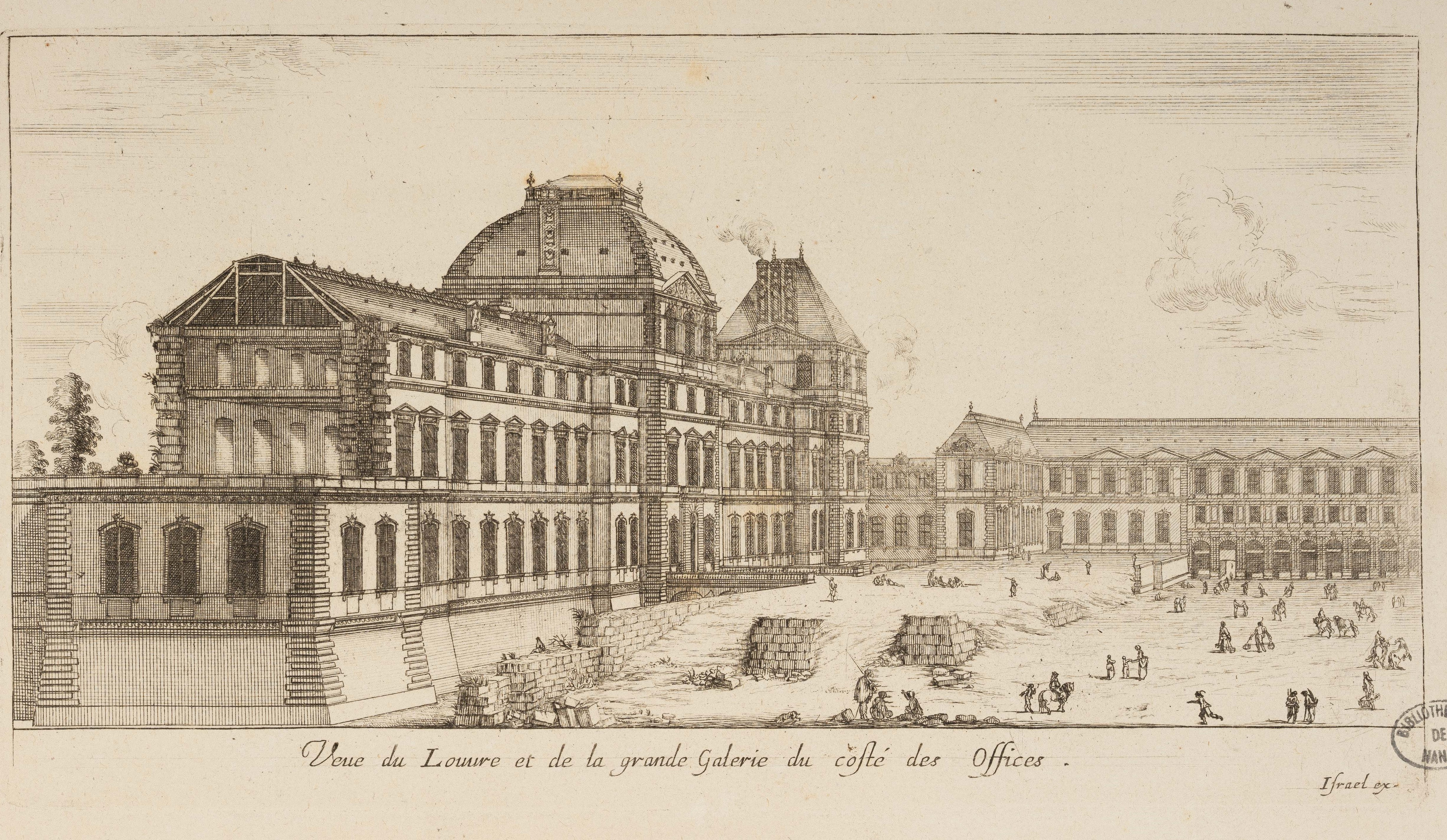
Mid-17th-century view of the Louvre by Israel Silvestre, with Grande Galerie on the right and Petite Galerie connecting it with the Lescot Wing at center

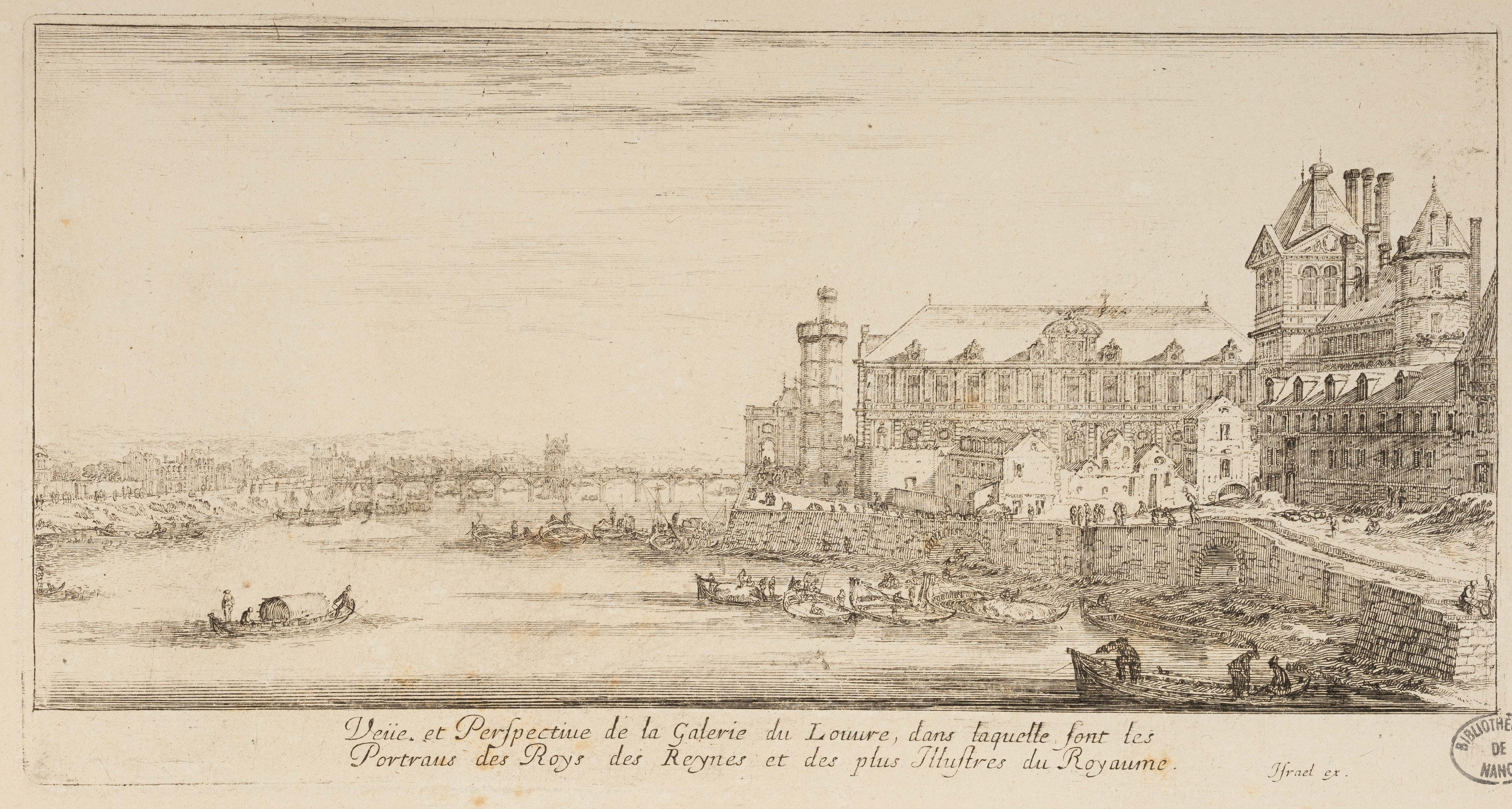
East façade of the Petite Galerie before the 1661 fire, by Israel Silvestre

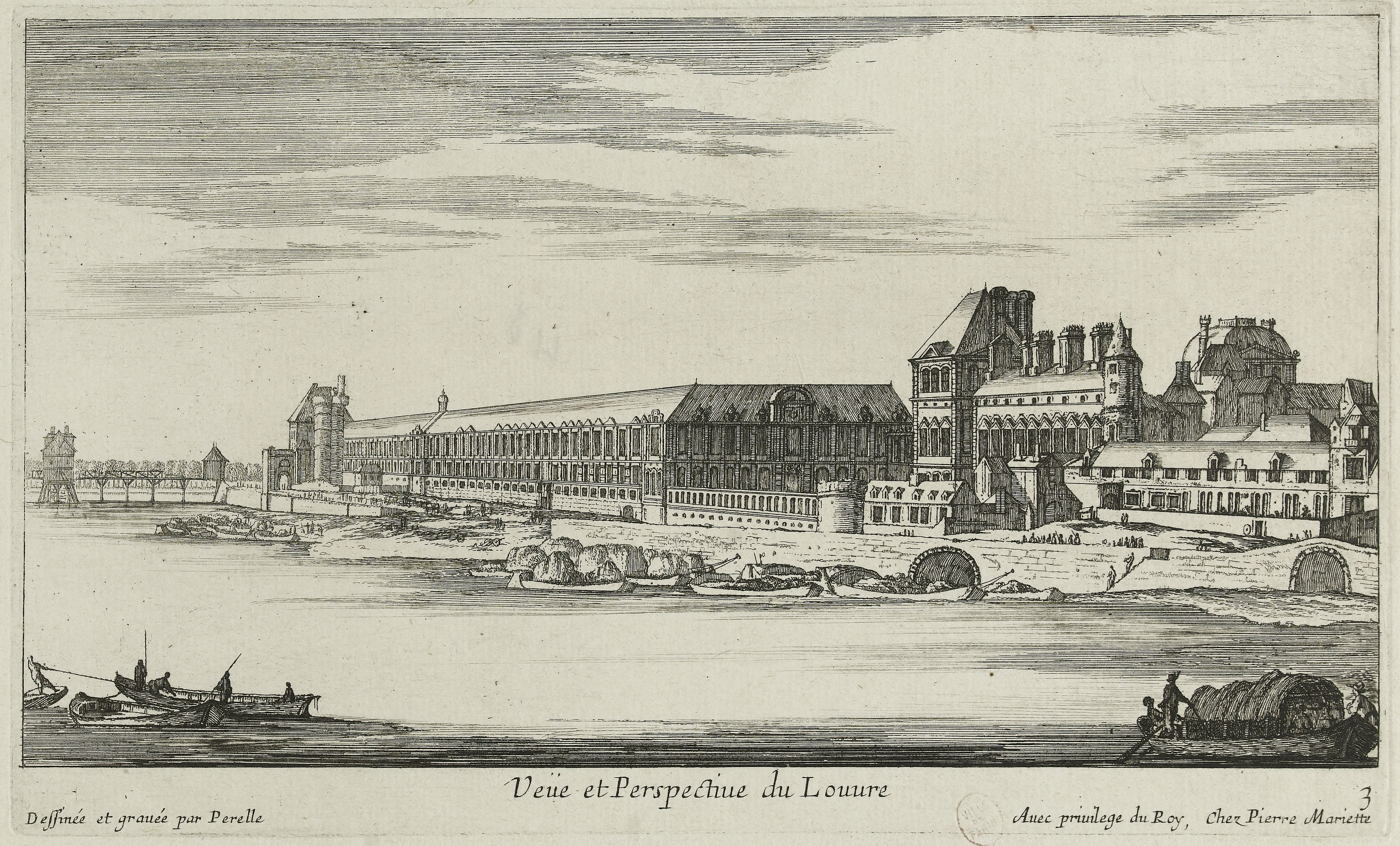
View of the Louvre before 1661, by Gabriel Perelle

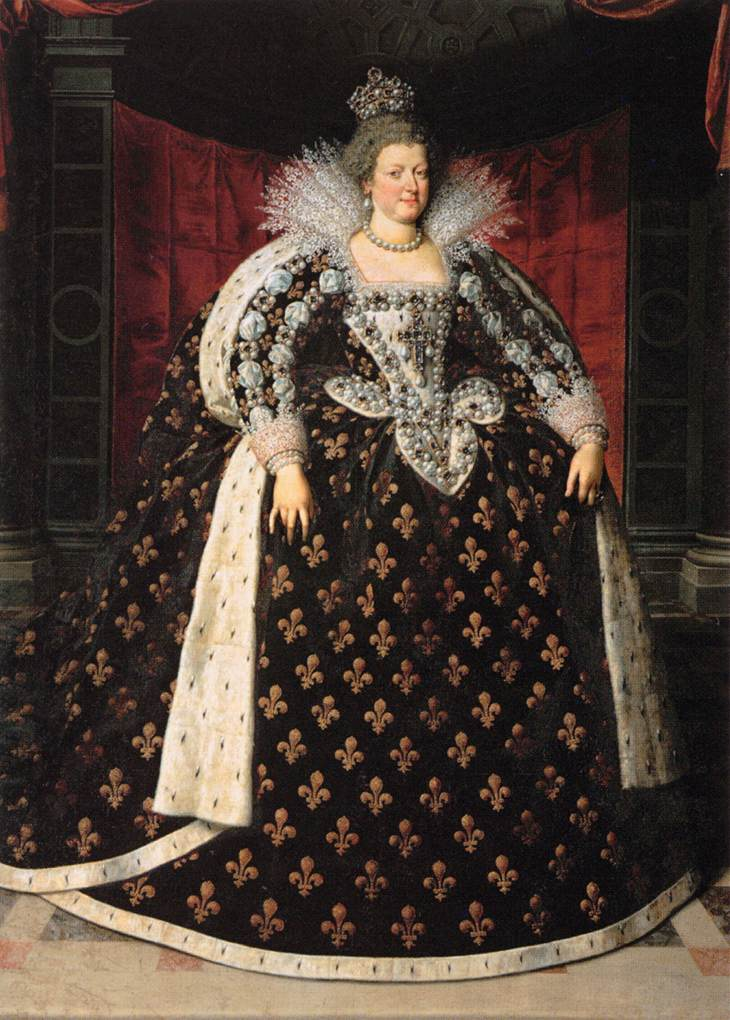
Marie de' Medici by Frans Pourbus the Younger, a rare surviving item from Henry IV's Galerie des Rois

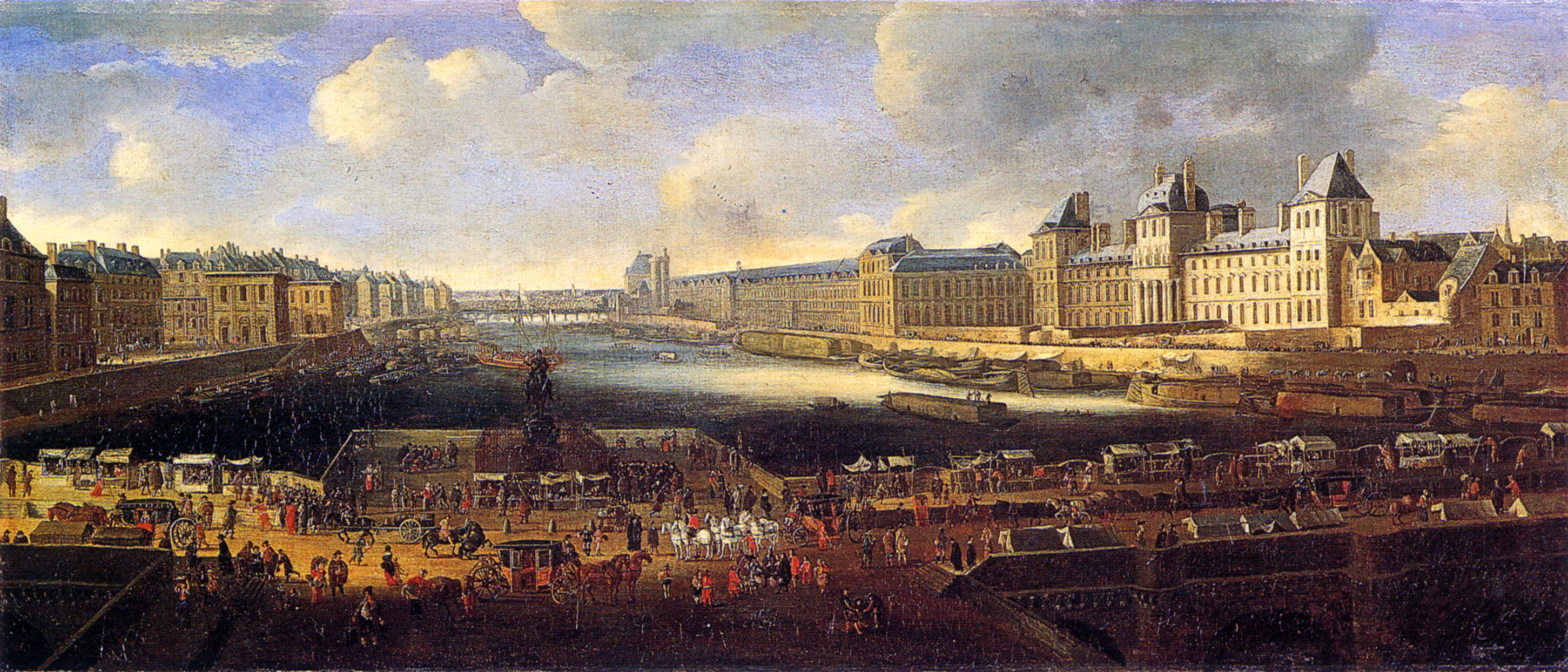
Anonymous view of the Louvre in 1666 showing the Petite Galerie as redesigned by Le Vau after the fire

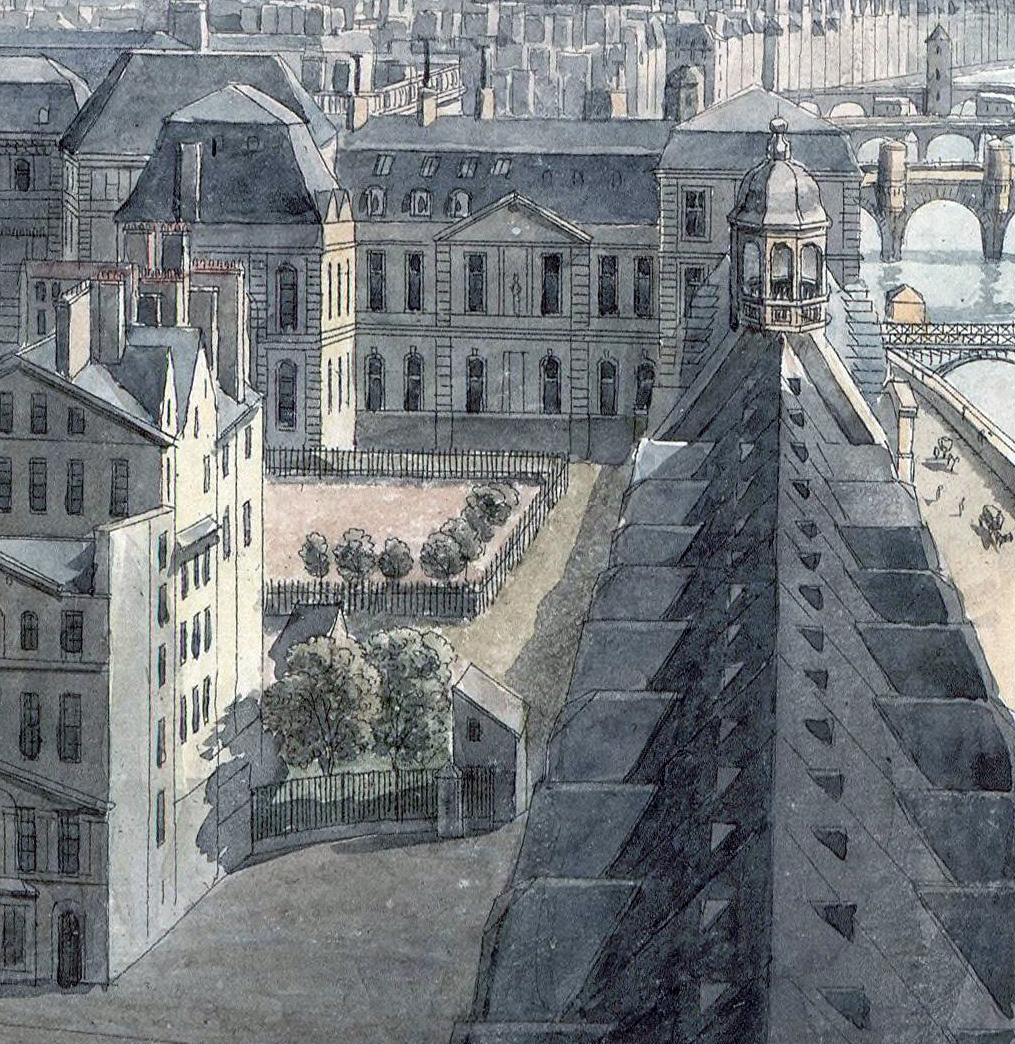
Drawing of the Louvre in 1828, showing Le Vau's western façade of the wing doubling the Petite Galerie to the West, now in the Cour du Sphinx

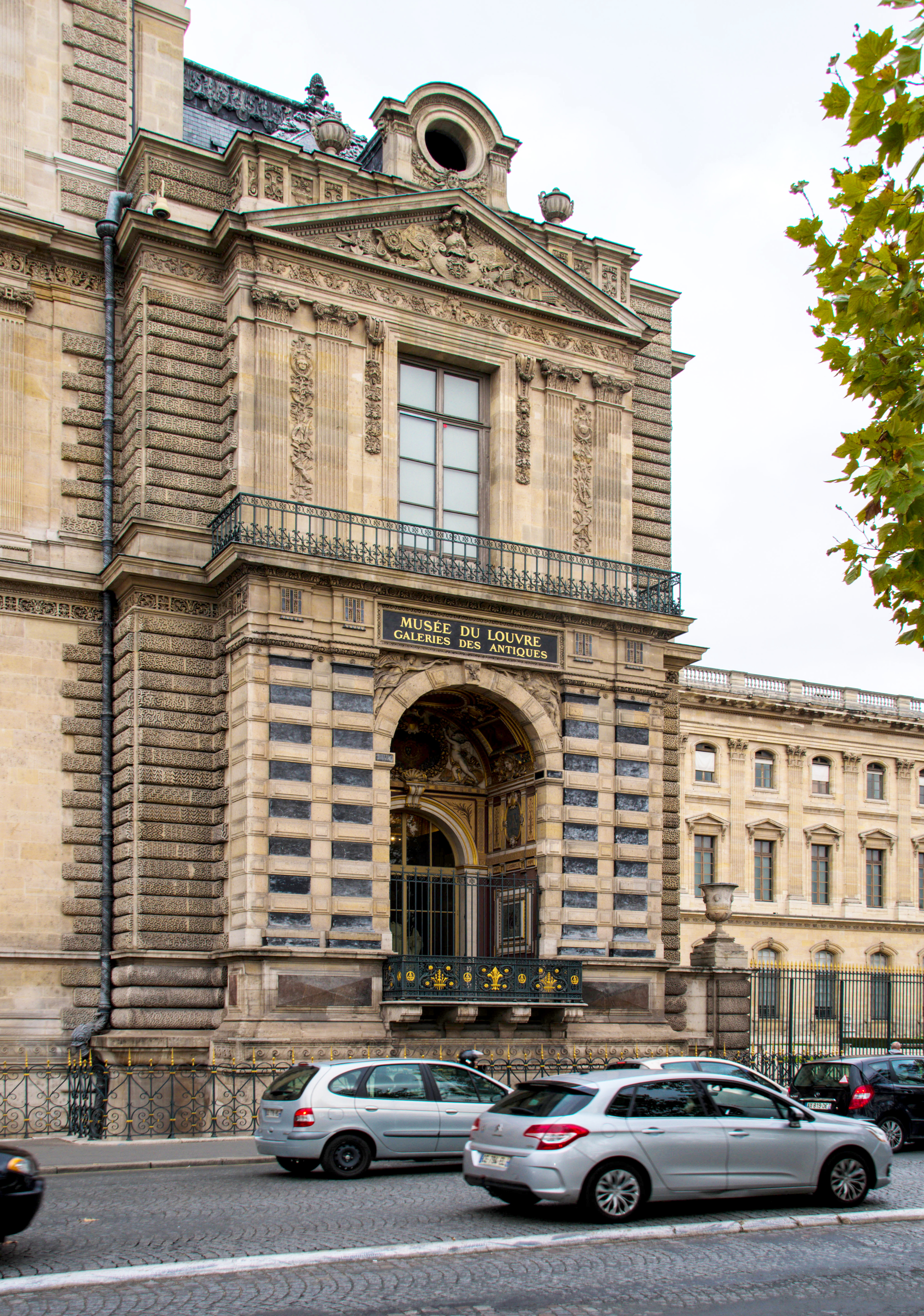
South façade of the Petite Galerie in 2016, as restored by Duban in 1851

== See also ==
- Palace of Fontainebleau#Gallery of Francis I

== Bibliography ==
- Bresc-Bautier, Genevieve (1995). The Louvre: An Architectural History. New York: The Vendome Press. ISBN 9780865659636.
- Bresc-Bautier, Geneviève (2019). The Louvre: The History, the Collections, the Architecture, with photographs by Gérard Rondeau. New York: Rizzoli Electa ISBN 9780847868933.
- Fonkenell, Guillaume (2004). "La Petite Galerie avant la galerie d'Apollon", pp. 24–31, in La galerie d'Apollon au palais du Louvre, edited by Geneviève Bresc-Bautier. Paris: Gallimard / Musée du Louvre. ISBN 9782070117895.
