= Percier and Fontaine =

19th-century French architects

Percier and Fontaine was a noted partnership between French architects Charles Percier and Pierre François Léonard Fontaine.

== History ==
Together, Percier and Fontaine were inventors and major proponents of the rich and grand, consciously archaeological versions of early 19th-century Neoclassical architecture known as Directoire style and Empire style. They were the official government architects for Emperor Napoleon. They were also "two of the most celebrated teachers at the legendary Ecole des Beaux-Arts."

Following Charles Percier's death in 1838, Fontaine designed a tomb in their characteristic style in the Pere Lachaise Cemetery. Percier and Fontaine had lived together as well as being colleagues.

Fontaine married late in life and after his death in 1853 his wife placed his body in the same tomb according to his wishes.
