= List of works by Eugène Guillaume =

The following is a list of works by French sculptor Jean-Baptiste Claude Eugène Guillaume.

== Works in cathedrals and churches ==
Name	Location	Date	Notes
"Le couronnement de la Vierge"	Marseille Cathedral		Guillaume's marble relief decorates the centre of the tympanum over the cathedral's entrance.
Statue of St Geneviève	Église Saint Paul-Saint Louis. Paris		A work in marble depicting the Saint known as the "protectress of Paris"
Statue of Sainte Cécile	Église Saint-Eustache Paris	1852	Guillaume completed a statue of Sainte Cécile and the compositions " Saül furieux - David jouant de la harpe" for the church organ's casing.
Sainte Cécile and other works	Église Sainte Clotilde	1854	Guillaume executed a statue of Sainte Cécile and bas-reliefs depicting scenes from the lives of Sainte Valère (2) and Sainte Clotilde (2) and another depicting the marriage of Sainte Clotilde and King Clovis.
Statues of Saint Augustin, Saint Grégoire de Naziance, Saint Hilaire de Poitiers and Saint Athanase	Église de la Trinité, Paris	1863	Guillaume was commissioned to execute these statues on the church's façade.

== Beaux-arts de Paris, l'école nationale supérieure ==
Guillaume was a pupil of the school and won the 1845 Prix de Rome. Several of his works are held in the school's collection.

Name	Location	Date	Notes
"Thésée soulevant le rocher, retrouve l'épée de son père"	Paris, École Nationale Supéreure des Beaux-arts.	1845	Guillaume won the Prix de Rome with his version of that year's chosen subject "Thésée soulevant le rocher". A Ronde-bosse in plaster.
Bust of Félix Duban	Beaux-arts de Paris, l'école nationale supérieure	1884	This bronze bust was intended as external decoration for the school. The bust stood on a pedestal with a carving of a cherub.
Bust of Pierre-Charles Simart	Beaux-arts de Paris, l'école nationale supérieure	1884	Bust of fellow sculptor.
Bust of Jean-Hippolyte Flandrin	Beaux-arts de Paris, l'école nationale supérieure	1871	Bust of the painter
Relief portrait of Alexis Paccard	Beaux-arts de Paris, l'école nationale supérieure	Not known.	A bronze medallion depicting the architect.

== Works in the Musée d'Orsay ==
Name	Location	Date	Notes
"Le Faucheur"	Musée d'Orsay, Paris	1849	This bronze statue of a reaper at work was cast by Eck et Durand. The plaster model was executed by Guillaume at the Villa Médicis and is now located at the Musée des Beaux-Arts in Montbard whilst another copy in bronze can be seen at the Ny Carlsberg Glyptotek in Copenhagen. In 1855 the statue was acquired by Napoléon III for his collection then passed to the Musée national du château de Fontainebleau then the Musée du Luxembourg before finally being taken into the Musée d'Orsay. Le Faucheur. The Copenhagen bronze
"Les Gracques"	Musée d'Orsay Paris.	1853	A double bust in bronze of the Gracchi brothers, Tiberius and Gaius the Roman plebeian nobiles cast by Eck et Durand. Casting was from a plaster model made at the Villa Médicis in 1847 to 1848. A marble version was also made and shown in 1889 at the l'Éxposition Universelle in Paris. The plaster version can be seen at the Musée des Beaux-Arts in Montbard and the Musée des Beaux-Arts in Angers. The Musée des Beaux-Arts in Rouen also hold a copy. The foundry Barbedienne produced a smaller bronze version. In 1853 the work was acquired by the Musées Impériaux and eventually, in 1986, was taken into d'Orsay. The work was shown at the Paris Salon of 1853.
"Napoleon III on horseback"	Musée d'Orsay, Paris	1865	An esquisse for a high relief intended as decoration for the "Carrousel du Louvre". Can be seen on the facade of the Préfecture de Marseille.
Bust of Madame Pierre-Edouard Dumont	Musée d'Orsay, Paris	1860	A marble bust
Bust of Louis-Pierre Baltard	Musée d'Orsay, Paris	1873	A plaster bust. Baltard was professor of architectural theory at the Paris École des Beaux-Arts.
Bust of Monseigneur Georges Darboy	Musée d'Orsay, Paris	1874	Darboy was an Archbishop of Paris shot during the 1871 Paris Commune. The bust is in marble. The plaster model had been acquired by the French State from the 1873 Paris Salon and a bronze version was shown at the Paris Universal Exhibition of 1900. D'Orsay's marble version was shown at the 1875 Paris Salon, and at the Paris Universal Exhibitions of 1878 and 1889 and at the Vienna Universal Exhibition of 1882. The work was also shown at the exhibition "Rodin Rediscovered" held in Washington in 1981.
"Sapho"	Musée d'Orsay, Paris	1875	A maquette for a work in plaster ordered by the City of Paris and shown at the Salon of 1876. A marble version was shown at the Paris Exhibition of 1878. Below is a copy of the work "Sapho" which stands in front of the mairie of Marpent. Sapho
"Apollon et Daphne"	Musée d'Orsay, Paris		Plaster working model based on Ovid's "Les Métamorphoses" Book 1, Verses 452-567.
Anacréon	Musée d'Orsay, Paris	1851	Guillaume started this sculpture in 1850 whilst at the Villa Médicis and finished it in 1851. A plaster maquette of this work was shown at the 1852 Paris Salon and purchased by the City of Paris. A marble version was made and shown at the 1878 Paris Éxposition universelles and the 1882 Exhibition in Vienna. From 1895 to 1936 it stood in the Paris hôtel de ville. It is now placed in the museum's allée centrale des sculptures. Anacreon was a Greek poet. Anacréon
Bust of François Buloz	Musée d'Orsay, Paris	1877	Buloz was the founder of "La Revue des Deux Mondes". This marble bust was shown at the Paris Salons of 1879 and 1883.
"Orphee"	Musée d'Orsay, Paris	1878	An esquisse for a statuette. A bronze version can be seen on the gable of a house in Paris'
"Andromaque et Astyanax"	Musée d'Orsay, Paris	1881	A working model for a statuette in marble which was presented at the Paris Éxpositions of 1889 and 1900. A plaster model was shown at the Paris Salon of 1881 and this was transferred to Montpellier.
"Jeune fille à la harpe"	Musée d'Orsay, Paris		A plaster model of the statuette "Jeune fille à la harpe" is held in the museum's collection. Until 1921 it had been held by the artist's daughter when it was given as a gift to the musée du Louvre who passed it to d'Orsay in 1986.

== Public works in Paris ==
Name	Location	Date	Notes
Bust of Jacques Ignace Hittorff	Institut de France Paris		A marble bust of the German born architect.
"La Force"	Fontaine Saint Michel	1860	This fountain in Paris' place Saint-Michel features several sculptures including Guillaume's "La Force".
Statue of Saint Louis	Palais de Justice de Paris.	1878	Guillaume's statue is in the Saint-Louis gallery of the "Cour de cassation"
The tomb of Jérôme Bonaparte	Paris, Hôtel des Invalides	1862	This tomb, with Guillaume's bronze statue of Jérôme, is located in the Saint-Jérôme chapel of the église du Dôme des Invalides
"La Musique instrumentale"	Opéra de Paris (Palais Garnier)	1869	Four huge sculptures made from Echaillon stone decorate the front of the Paris Opéra: "La poésie" by François Jouffroy, Jean-Baptiste Carpeaux's "La danse", "Le drame lyrique" by Jean-Joseph Perraud and Guillaume's "La musique instrumentale" Marble sculpture "La Musique instrumentale" on the façade of the Palais Garnier, Paris.
"L'Histoire naturelle"	Muséum d'Histoire. Paris	1882	Guillaume completed some external decoration for the Paris Natural History museum. Marble sculpture L'Histoire naturelle.
Eugène Burnouf	Collège de France Paris	1892	A marble bust of the eminent French scholar.

== Works in The Louvre ==
Name	Location	Date	Notes
"La Beauté et l’Art"	The Louvre	1857	The two Oeil-de-boeuf on the front of the Pavillon Sully are Guillaume's "la Beauté et l’Art" on the left hand side, also known as "l’Art couronnant la Beauté" and "l’Alliance de l’art antique et de la Renaissance" by Jean-Marie Bonnassieux on the right hand side.
Pediment and Caryatid	The Louvre	1857	Around the dormer window on the Pavillon Turgot is a [pediment] and two [caryatid]s. Within this pediment are two sculptures, "l’Abondance" by Guillaume and "l’Histoire et la Poèsie" by Pierre-Jules Cavelier. "L'Abondance" is the work next to the Cour Napoléon and Cavelier's work is on the Carrousel side. Each sculptor added a caryatid. Pediment and caryatid on the south facade of the Pavillon Turgot
"L’Hospital"	The Louvre	1857	When he returned to Paris from Rome he was already known for the standard of the works he had sent from Rome to Paris and he received a number of public commissions including "L’Hospital" for the Daru wing of the Louvre. The Pavillon Daru and its wing were named in honour of the Intendant général de la Grande Armée Pierre Antoine Noël Bruno, comte Daru and Guillaume's contribution to the many sculptures decorating the building was "Michel de l'Hôpital"
'"La Céramique"'	The Louvre	1874	In niches on the ground floor of the Lemercier wing of the Cour Carrée are various sculptures including Guillaume's "La Céramique". "La Céramique"

== Studies of Napoleon ==
Name	Location	Date	Notes
Napoléon Ier en costume antique	Paris, musée d'Orsay	1859	A work in plaster
Napoleon as a Roman emperor		1858	A preparatory working model in brown wax. This is thought to be the model for the marble statue shown at the Paris Salon of 1861 and now in Switzerland's château de Prangins.
Napoleon on horseback in military uniform.	musée d'Orsay, Paris	1862	A preparatory working model in maroon wax for a statue planned for the Louvre but which never materialized. Another wax working model is held by the Musée national du château de Malmaison.
Busts of Napoleon	Rueil-Malmaison Musée national des châteaux de Malmaison et de Bois-Préau.	1867	Several busts of Napoleon were executed by Guillaume for the 1867 "Exposition universelle" . These were "Napoléon à Brienne", "Napoléon, général en chef de l’armée d'Italie", "Napoléon, premier consul", "Napoléon, empereur" and "Napoléon, à Sainte-Hélène"..
Statuette of Napoleon on horseback and in Roman costume	Paris; musée d'Orsay		The museum have a working model (Esquisse) in wax.
"Napoléon Ier en costume de sacre"	Paris, Musée de l'Armée		A bust in marble.

== Miscellaneous ==
Name	Location	Date	Notes
"Pyrrhus tuant Priam"	Whereabouts unknown. The work was probably destroyed.	1841	Accepted as a student at the Paris École des Beaux-arts in 1841, the college's subject for that years "Prix de Rome" was "Pyrrhus tuant Priam" and this was Guillaume's first officially recorded work.
Tomb of Paul de Saint-Victor		1882	A bronze bust for Saint-Victor's tomb.
The tomb of Alexis Paccard	Père-Lachaise cemetery	1868	Guillaume executed a medallion in white marble for this tomb.
The tomb of Francisque Joseph Duret	Père-Lachaise cemetery.		Guillaume worked with Eugène Lequesne on this sculptor's tomb. Lequesne executed a medallion depicting Duret whilst Guillaume carved a relief depicting "La génie de la sculpture" to which he added a sculptor's mallet and chisel.
Claude Bernard	Collège de France	1886	Sadly this bronze statue by Guillaume was melted down by the German's during the occupation.

== Public works outside of Paris ==
Name	Location	Date	Notes
"Vierge de l’Immaculée Conception"	Marseille	1857	This bronze statue can be seen by the intersection of Marseille's Boulevards de la Liberté and Camille Flammarion
Bust of Marc Seguin	Saint Etienne	1881	This work is located in the Saint Etienne Chamber of Commerce.
Statue of Antoine César Becquerel	Châtillon-Coligny	1882	A bronze statue located outside the old Châtillon-Coligny "Porte des Bourgeois"
Statue of Michel Eugene Chevreul	Angers; musée des beaux-arts	1887	A fragment of the original plaster model for the bronze statue inaugurated in 1893 and placed in the Angers' jardin des plantes.
Statue of Nicephore Niepce	Chalons-sur-Saône place du Port-Villiers	1878	Guillaume's plaster version of this statue of one of the inventors of photography was cast in bronze and unveiled on 21 June 1885. Niepce was born in Chalons-sur-Saône. He developed a process he called heliography in the 1820s and later worked on other photographic techniques with Louis Daguerre. Guillaume depicts Niepce holding a photographic plate and an early camera.
Statue of Blaise Pascal	Clermont-Ferrand	1879	A statue of the French mathematician stands in Clermont-Ferrand's square Pascal. Pascal statue in Clermont-Ferrand
Statue of Jean-Philippe Rameau	Dijon	1878	It was in 1878 that the bronze statue of the French composer was inaugurated after some delay whilst the necessary funds for the casting were found. The bronze was shown at the 1878 Paris Salon. Sadly the bronze was removed by the authorities in 1943 so that the metal could be melted down and re-used in the war effort. In 1950 a statue in stone was erected in replacement. Statue of Jean-Philippe Rameau
Statue of Adolphe Thiers	Versailles, châteaux de Versailles et de Trianon	1880	This work in plaster was purchased by the French State when shown at the 1880 Paris Salon. It was destined for the Musée de Versailles.
Bust of Louis Bouilhet	Rouen	1882	This bust of the French poet and dramatist can be seen in Rouen's Rue Jean Lecanuet / Rue Jacques Vilon in a niche at the front of the Musée des Beaux-Arts. Bouilhet's main works are listed on each side of the niche.
Statue of Jean-Baptiste Colbert	Reims Square Colbert	1860	This statue of one of Louis XIV's chief ministers was cast in bronze by Eck et Durand.
Allegories of "Navigation" and "Commerce"	Palais de la Bourse (Marseille)	1856	Guillaume's allegorical statues "Navigation" and "Commerce" decorate the front of Marseille's Palais de la bourse. The building houses the Chambre de commerce et d'industrie Marseille-Provence. "Navigation". "Commerce"
"La Justice" and the reliefs "La Justice répressive" and "La Justice protectrice"	Palais de Justice Marseille		Guillaume's massive allegory of "Justice" is surrounded by "La Force", "Le Crime", "La Prudence" and "L'Innocence" and the reliefs "la Justice protectrice" and "la Justice répressive" decorate the front of the Palais de Justice.
"François Ier et sa soeur Marguerite fondant le Collège de France"	Bagnères-de-Luchon	1905	A work in marble

== Works in museums outside of Paris ==
Name	Location	Date	Notes
Bust of Jules Grévy	Château de Chambord	1896	A bust in marble. Jules Grévy
Bust of Maurice Richard	Paris; musée Rodin	1878	A work in plaster.
"La Nymphe Castalie" or "Source de la Poésie"	Lyon, musée des Beaux-Arts		A work in marble depicting Castalia who in Greek mythology, was a nymph whom Apollo transformed into a fountain at Delphi, at the base of Mount Parnassos, or at Mount Helicon. Castalia could inspire the genius of poetry to those who drank her waters. La Nymphe Castalie
"Horace et Lesbie"	Ivry-sur-Seine	1894	The two white marble statues are held in Ivry-sur-Seine's hôtel de ville. Horace holds a lyre whilst Lesbos has a dead bird on her lap. Both studies include a cherub. The Musée d'Orsay hold the original plaster maquettes. Originally ordered in 1880 by the Paris Hôtel de Ville these pieces were in the "salle des fêtes" until 1938 when they were moved to Ivry.
"Le Mariage romain"	Dijon; Musée des Beaux-Arts	1877	A plaster version of this work was shown at the 1877 Paris Salon and was purchased by the French State. This can now be seen at the Château royal de Blois museum. A marble version was executed for Dijon. Le Mariage romain
Statue of Jacques-Bénigne Bossuet	Chantilly; musée Condé	1887	A work in marble ordered by Henri d'Orléans Duke of Aumale for the Château de Chantilly. Statue of Bossuet in the grounds of the Château de Chantilly
Ingres monument			A bronze bust of Jean Auguste Dominique Ingres stands on a marble pedestal decorated with medallions of Flandrin and Simart the two favourite pupils of Ingres.

== The museum at Montbard ==
The Musée des Beaux-arts de Montbard hold several pieces by Guillaume including a bust of Beethoven and copies of "The Reaper" and the "Gracchi". They also hold a Guillaume bust of Pierre-Simon Laplace the scientist.

== Gallery of images ==
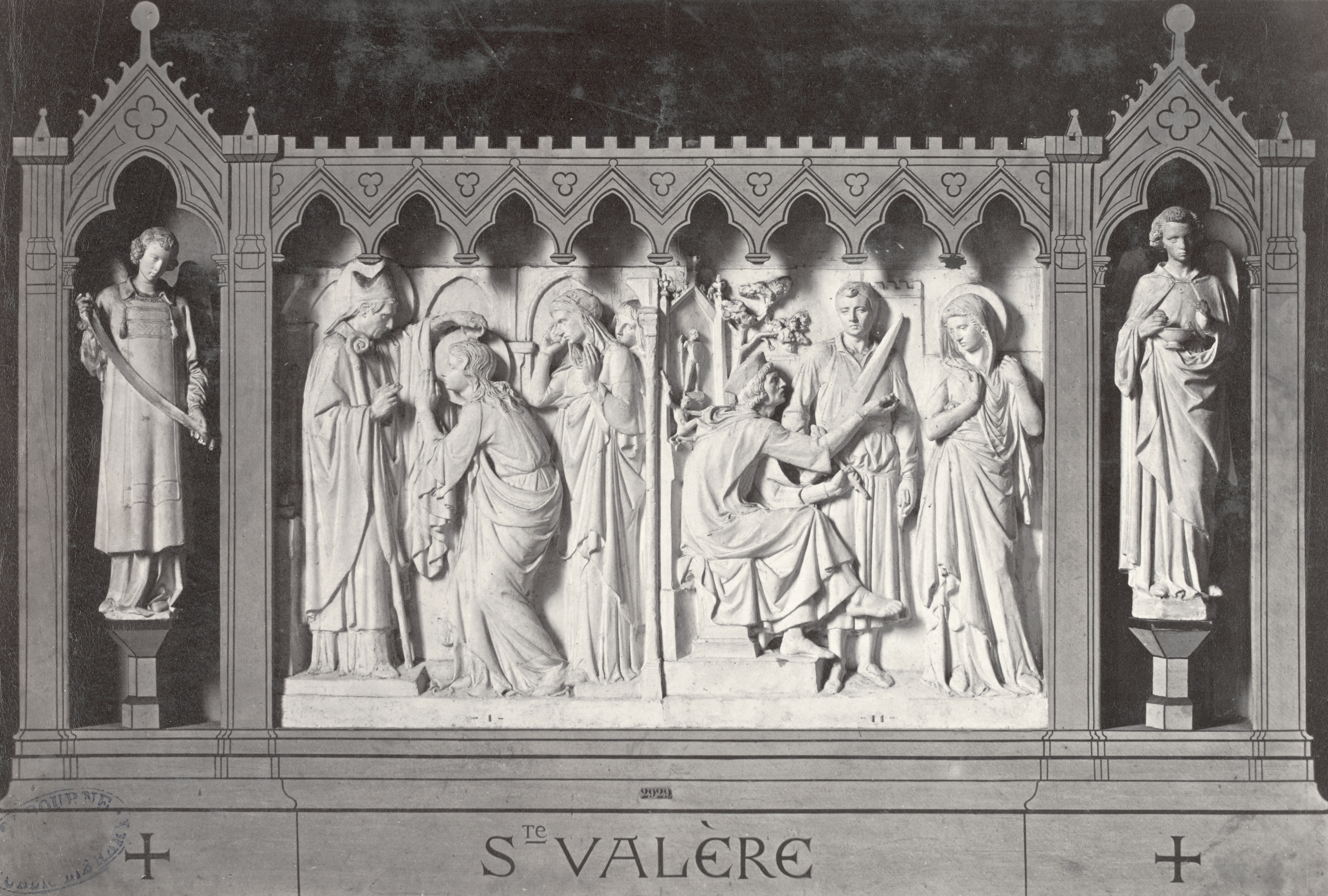
Scenes from the life of Ste. Valère,

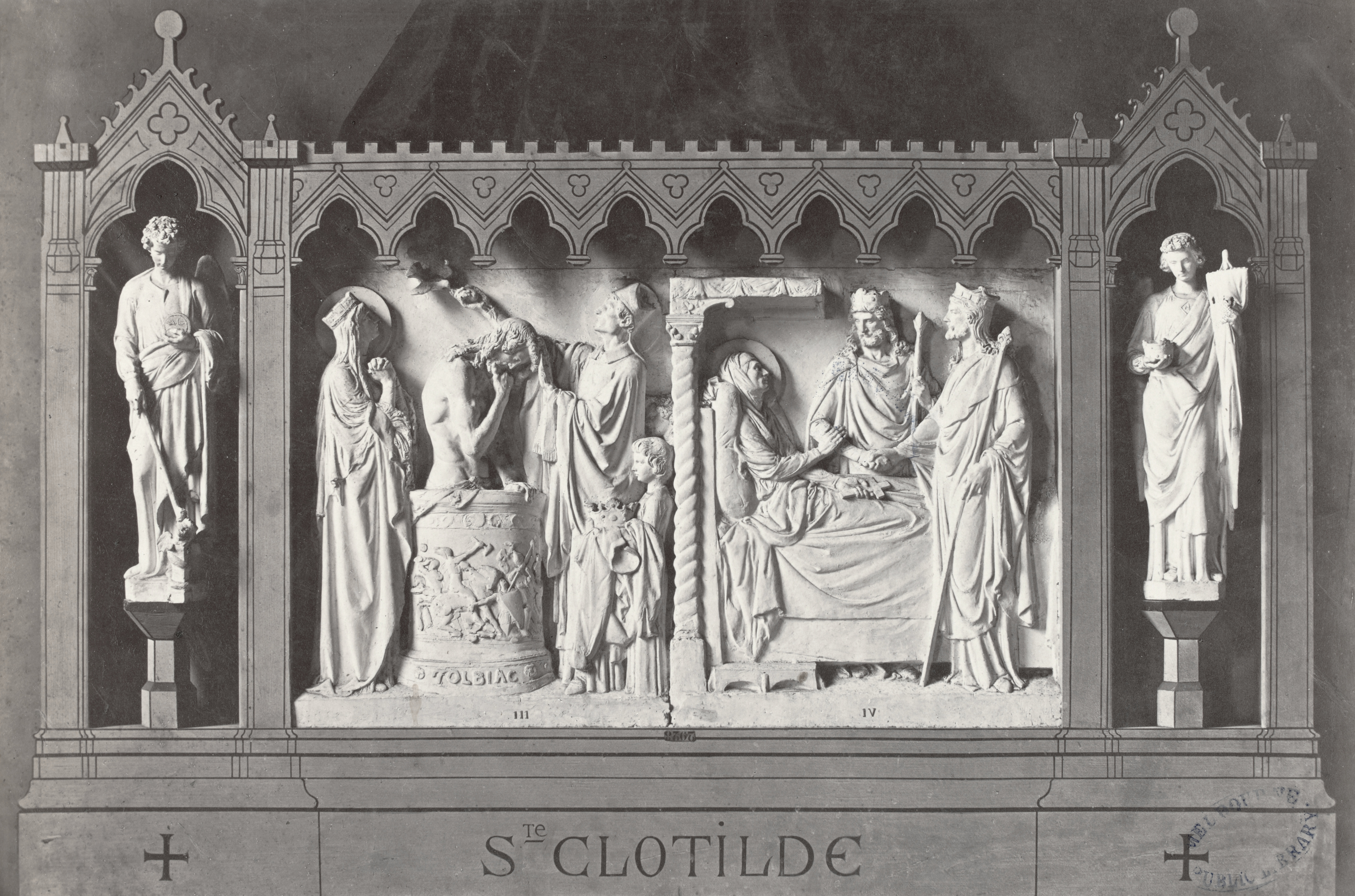
Scenes from the life of Ste. Clotilde.

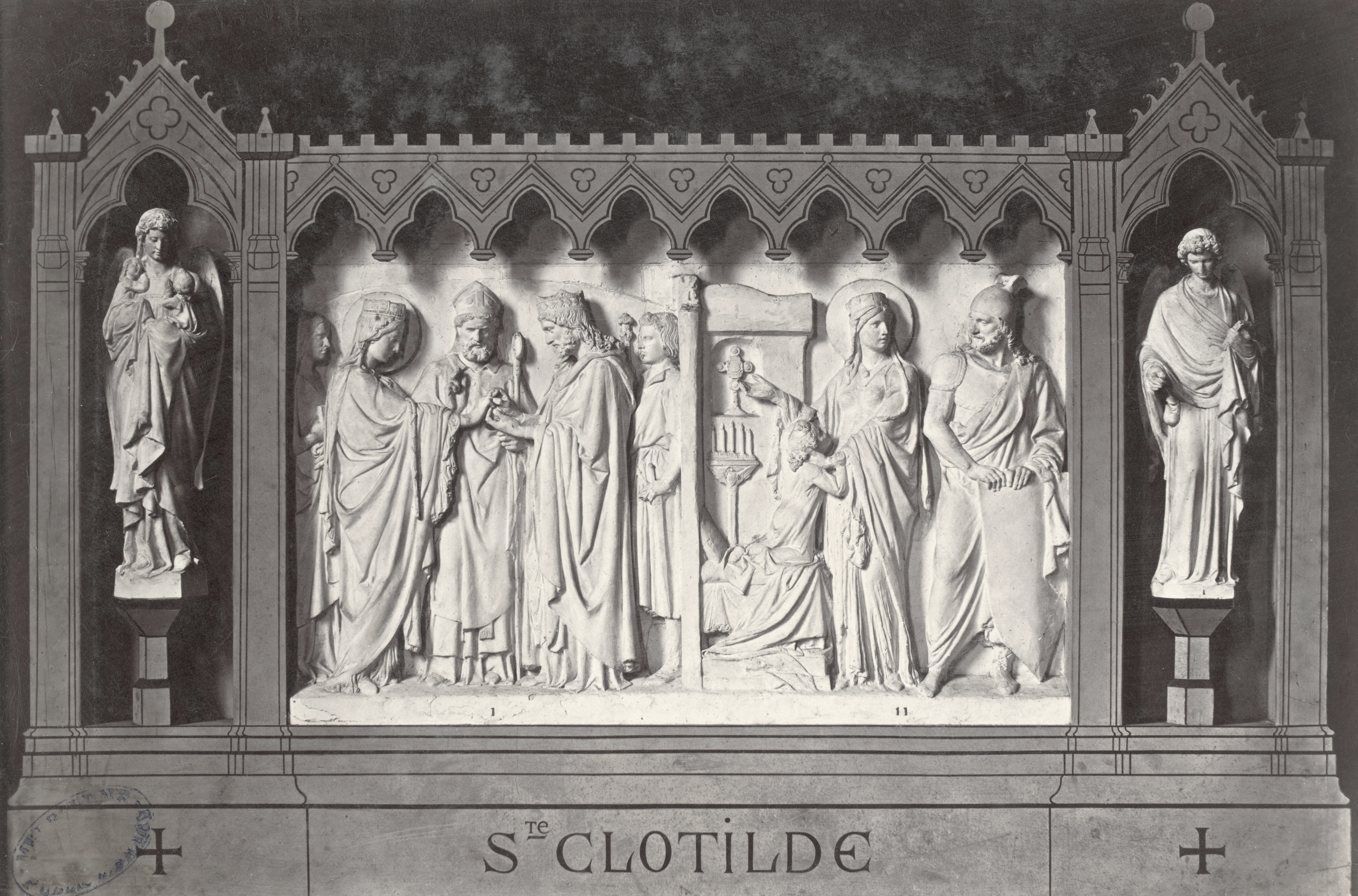
Bas relief of the marriage of St. Clotilde and King Clovis and possibly his conversion to Christianity.

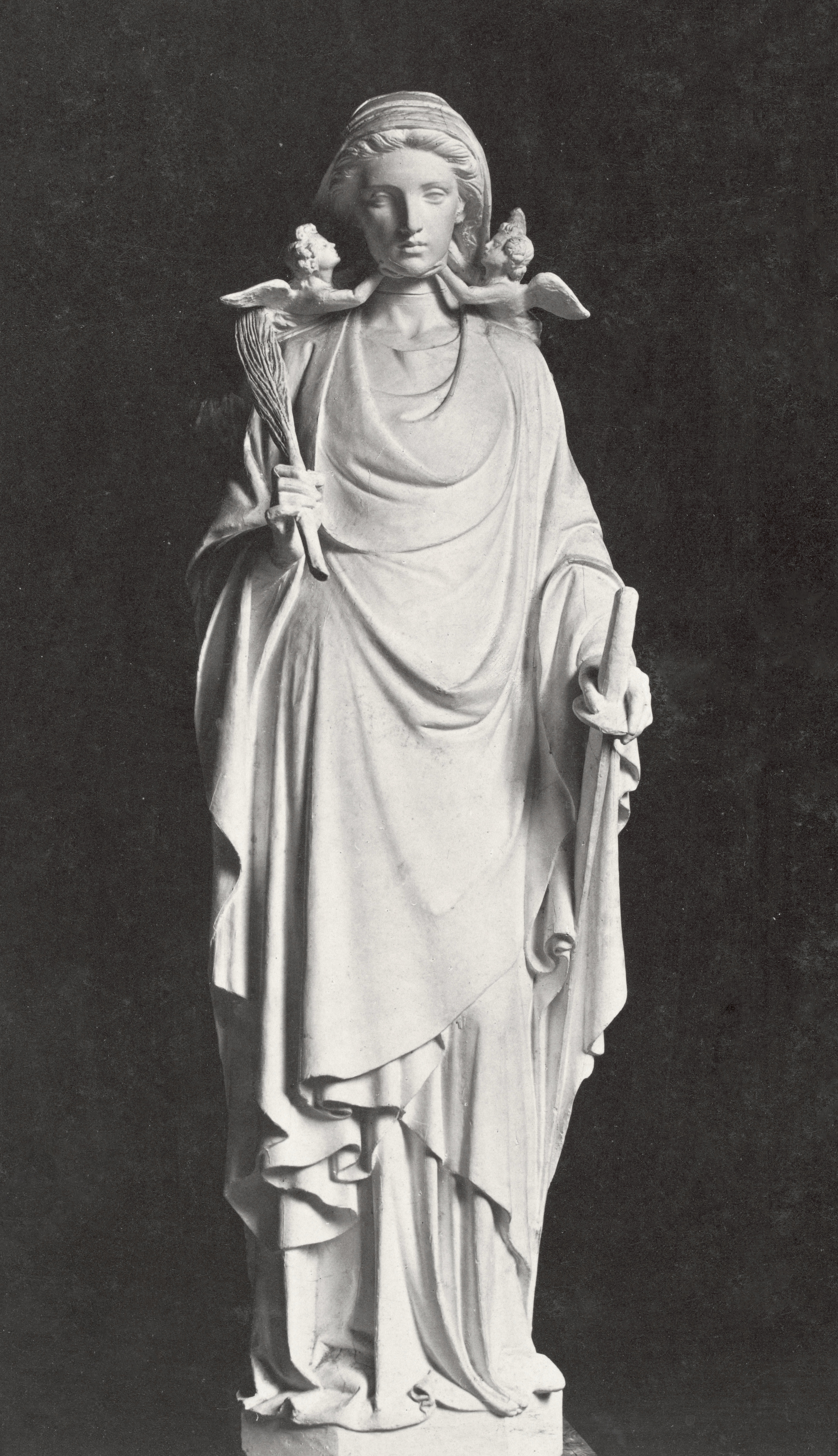
Marble statue of Sainte Cécile

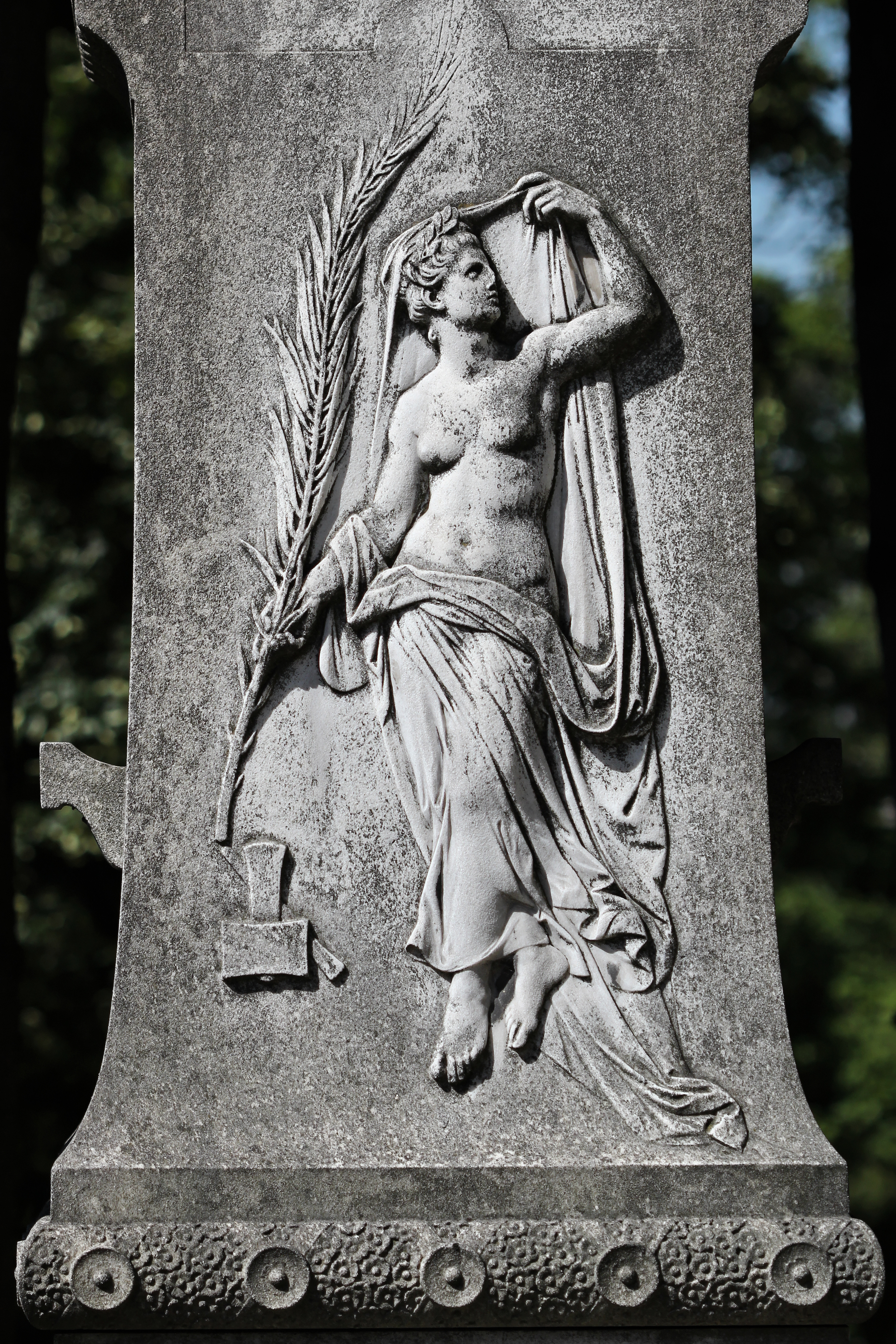
The tomb of Duret
