= Hector Lefuel =

French architect (1810-1880)

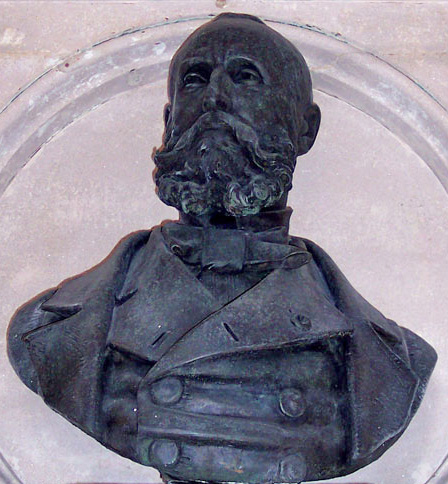
Hector Lefuel

Hector-Martin Lefuel (pronounced [ɛktɔʁ maʁtɛ̃ ləfɥɛl]; 14 November 1810 – 31 December 1880) was a French architect, best known for his work on the Palais du Louvre, including Napoleon III's Louvre expansion and the reconstruction of the Pavillon de Flore.

== Early life and training ==
He was born in Versailles, the son of Alexandre-Henry Lefuel (1782–1850), a building contractor. He was admitted to the École des Beaux-Arts in 1829, studied there with Jean-Nicolas Huyot and in 1833 received second place in the Prix de Rome competition. By that time, his father died, and he had to spend the next few years managing the family building business.

He won the Prix de Rome in 1839 and subsequently spent the years 1840 to 1844 as a pensionary of the French Academy in Rome at the Villa Medici.

== Early career ==
On his return to France, he opened his own practice and was appointed a building inspector for the Chamber of Deputies.

Having carried out alterations at the Château de Meudon (1848) and for the housing of the Manufacture Royal de Porcelaine de Sèvres (1852), he was appointed chief architect of the Château de Fontainebleau, one of the residences of Napoleon III under the new monarchical Second French Empire regime; there he designed a new Roccoco-style theatre (1853).

== Imperial architect ==
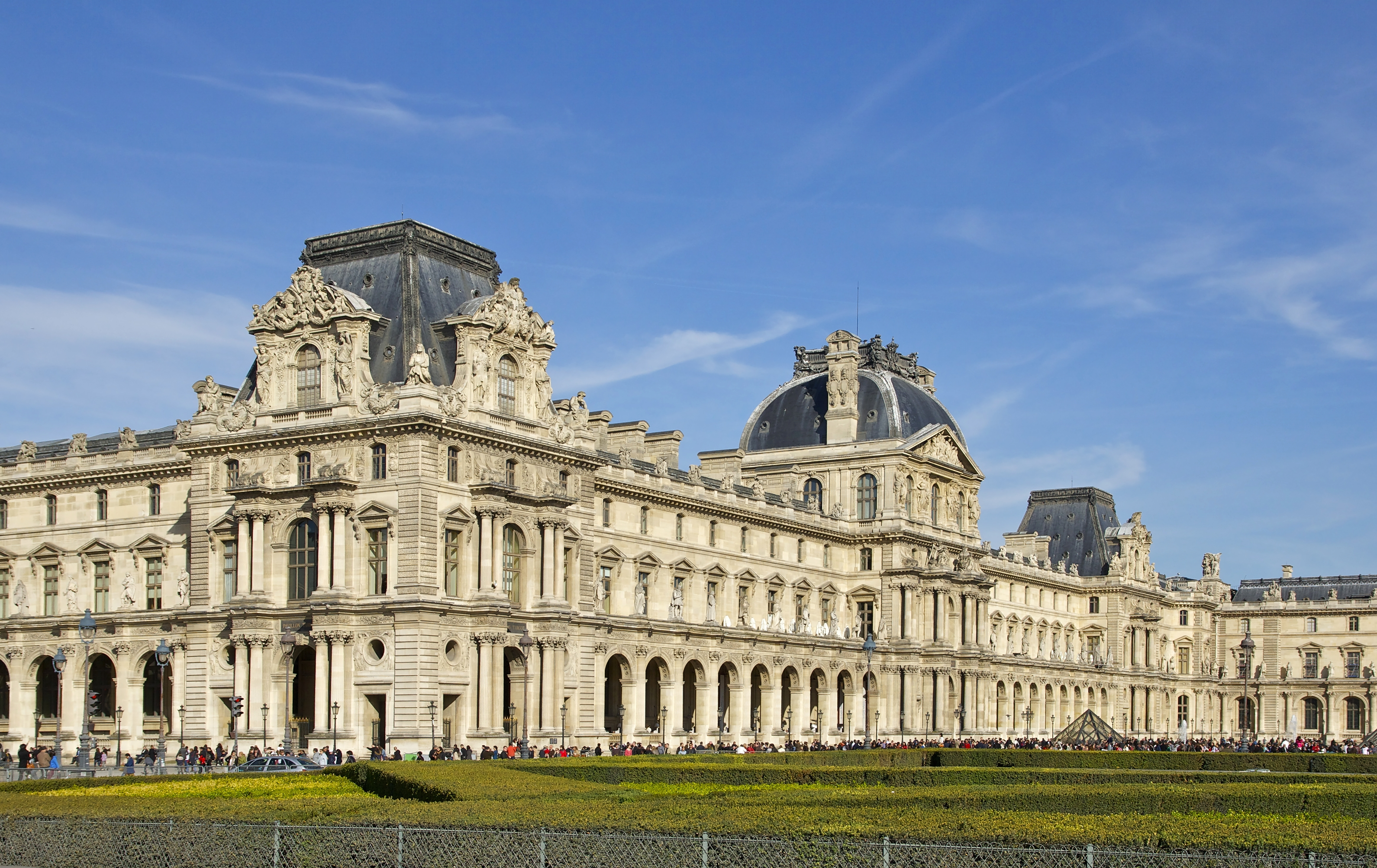
South façade of the Richelieu wing of the Louvre

Due to his work on the theatre at Fontainebleau, Lefuel had received favourable notice from Napoleon III. Following the death of the architect Louis-Tullius-Joachim Visconti in 1853, Lefuel was placed in charge of the ambitious project of completing the Louvre. He kept Visconti's plans but modified the elevations, enriching them in profuse ornamental detail, and completed the project in record time for opening on 14 August 1857, when it became one of the showpieces of the Second Empire. Around 1856–1857, Lefuel also created lavish apartments for the imperial household in the Palais des Tuileries (lost when that palace burned in the Paris Commune of 1871). Lefuel's work at the Louvre and the Tuileries became an exemplar of the nascent Second Empire architectural style.

He was elected to the Académie des Beaux-Arts in 1855, taking the chair of Martin-Pierre Gauthier. He was made a chevalier of the Legion of Honour in 1854, and a Commander of the Legion in 1857.

In his private practice, Lefuel designed and erected in Paris the Hôtel Fould (1856, destroyed) for Achille Fould, Minister of Finance under Napoléon III.

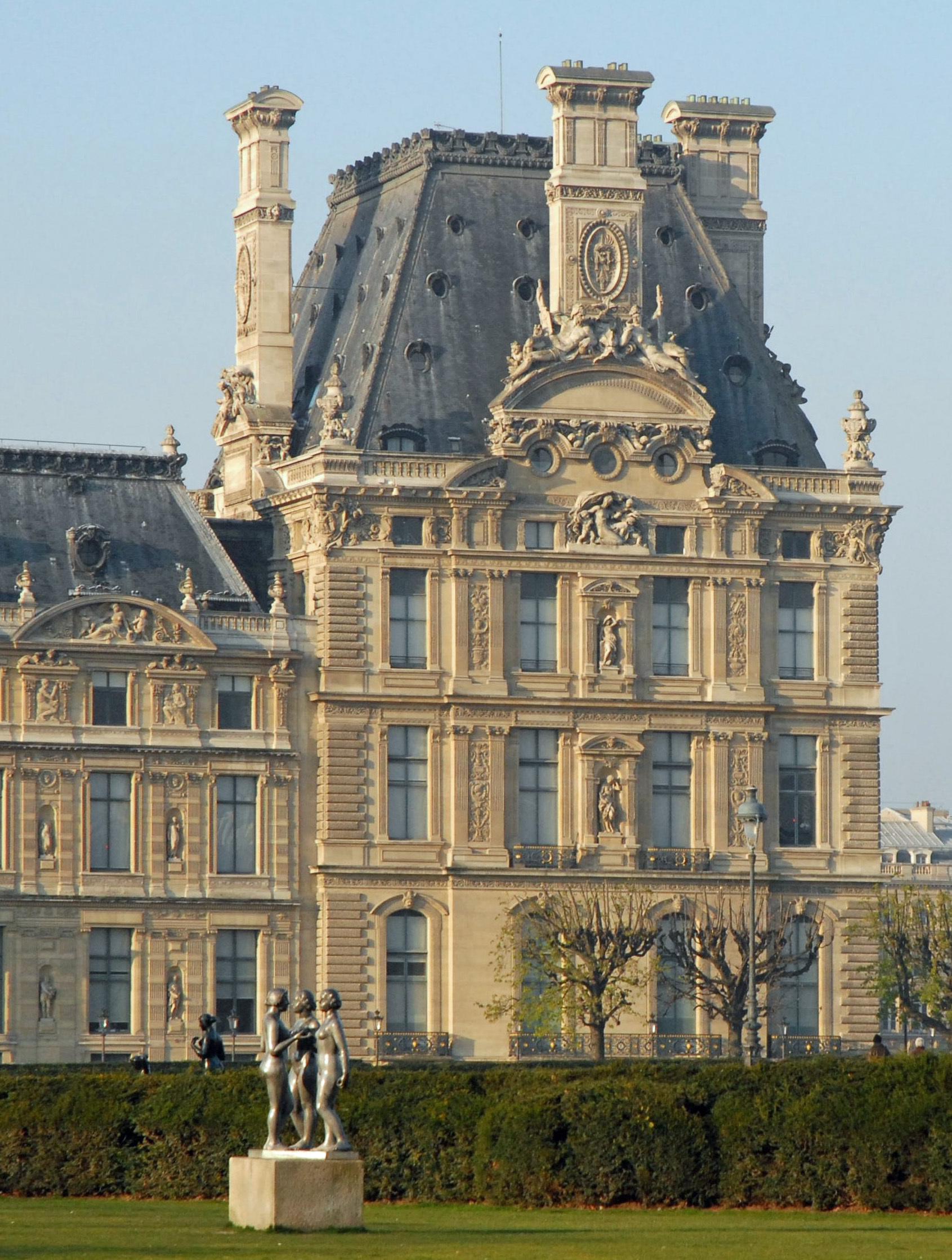
Pavillon de Flore, north facade

Napoleon III later tasked him with the reconstruction of the Pavillon de Flore and the western part of the Grande Galerie from the Pavillon de Flore to the Guichets du Carrousel, work which he carried out from 1861 to 1869.

In 1869–1876, he built Neudeck Palace for Fürst Henckel von Donnersmarck at Neudeck bei Bethen in Silesia. The palace was in Louis XIII style and was the grandest of three residences there of the Donnersmarcks. It was burnt out by Red Army or Wehrmacht soldiers in 1945 and demolished in 1961.

In 1870, he built the Hôtel Nieuwerkerke (in Paris's Parc Monceau) for the museum director Émilien de Nieuwerkerke (and the Hôtel Émonville in Abbeville).

After the Tuileries Palace was destroyed by fire in 1871, Lefuel reconstructed the western half of the Louvre’s Galerie Nord (1871–1876) and was in charge of the repairs to the Pavillon de Flore and the symmetrical reconstruction of the Pavillon de Marsan to the north, in 1874–1879.

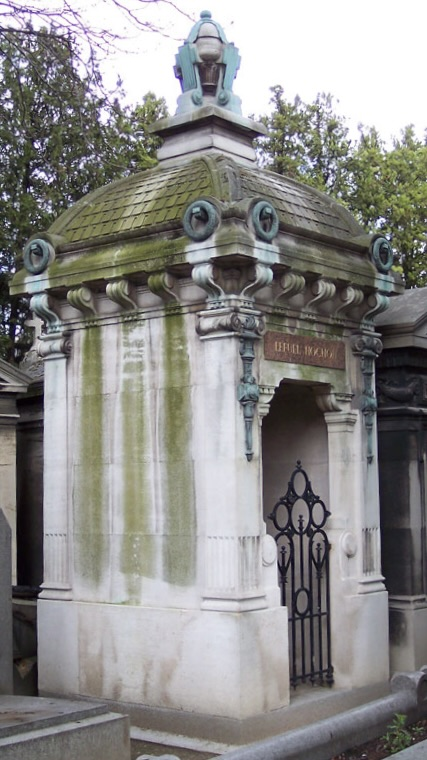
Lefuel's grave at Passy Cemetery

He designed funeral monuments, such as that to the composers Daniel-François-Esprit Auber and François Bazin at Père Lachaise Cemetery.

Hector-Martin Lefuel died in Paris and is buried at Passy Cemetery.

== Gallery ==
Lefuel's exteriors and interiors at the Louvre
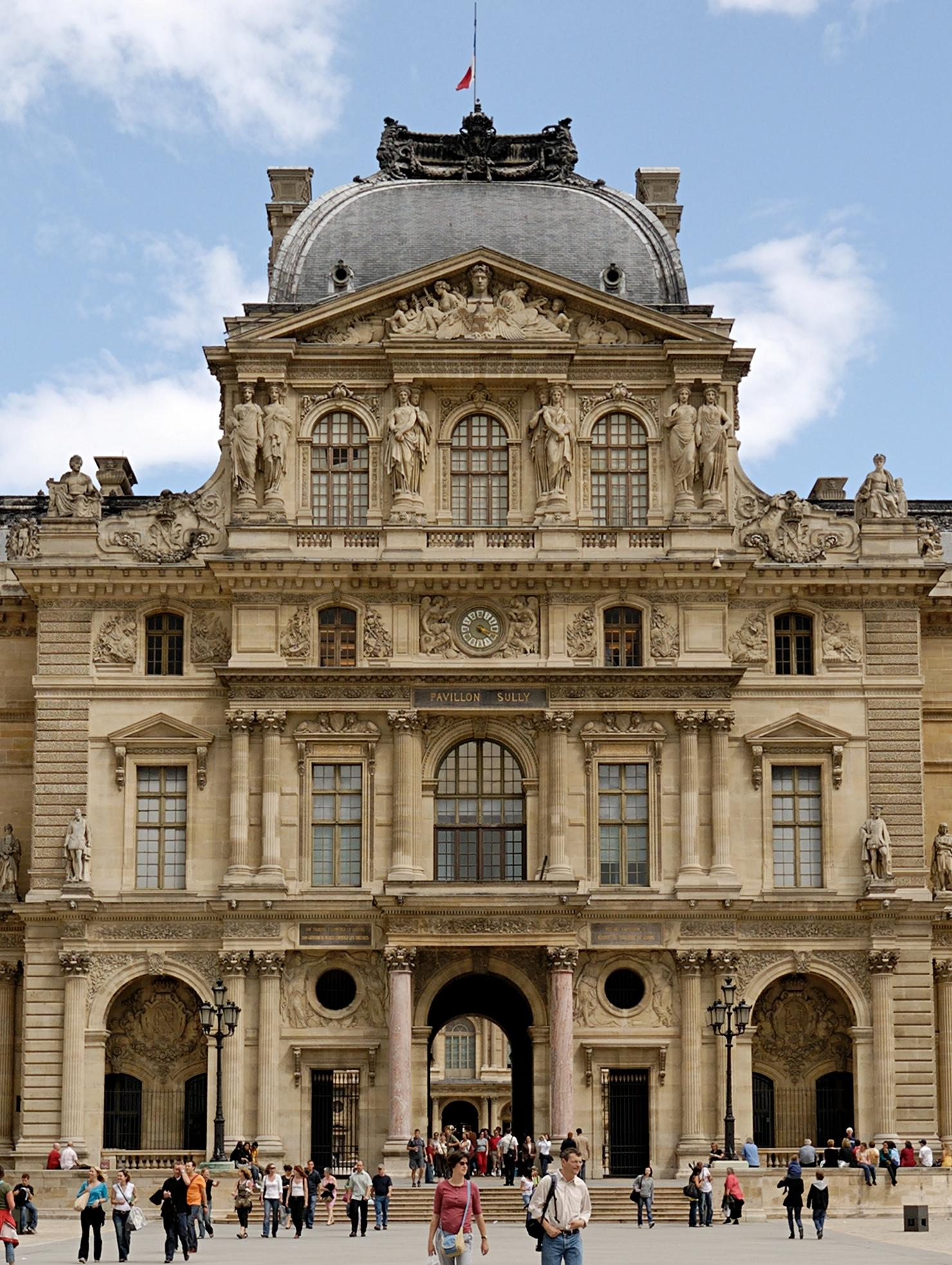
Pavillon Sully at the eastern end of the Cour Napoleon

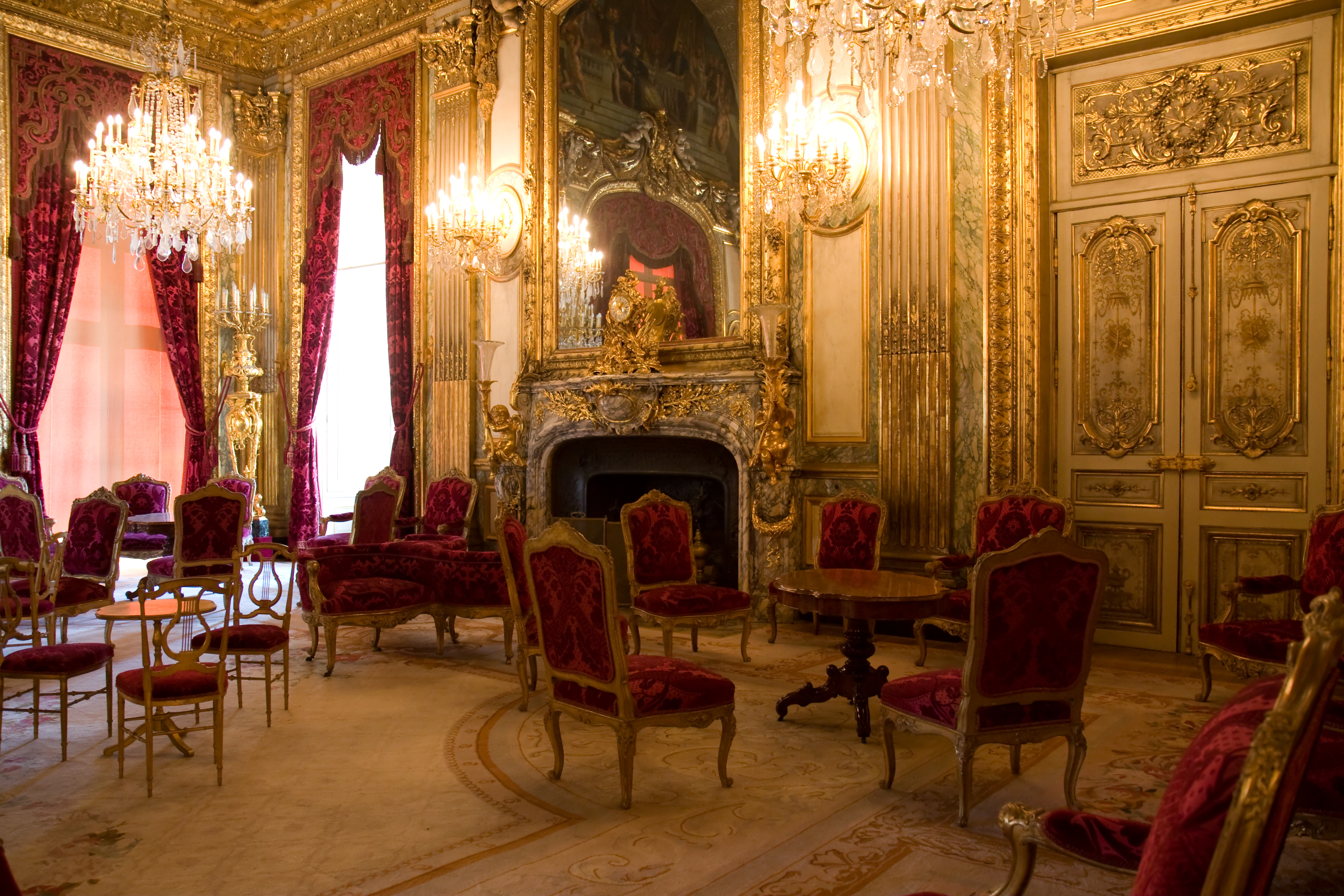
Grand Salon of the Napoleon III Apartments

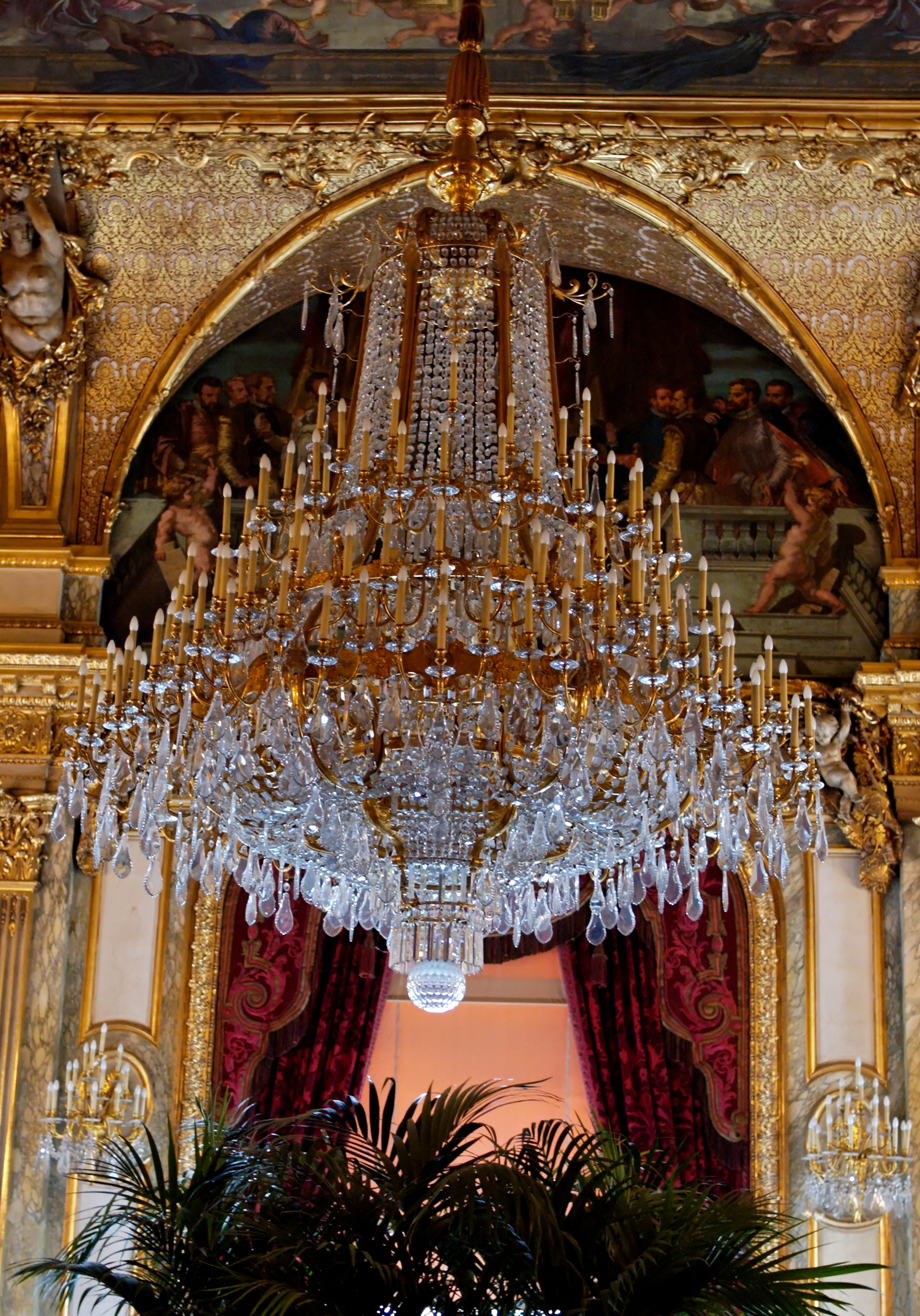
Central chandelier of the Grand Salon

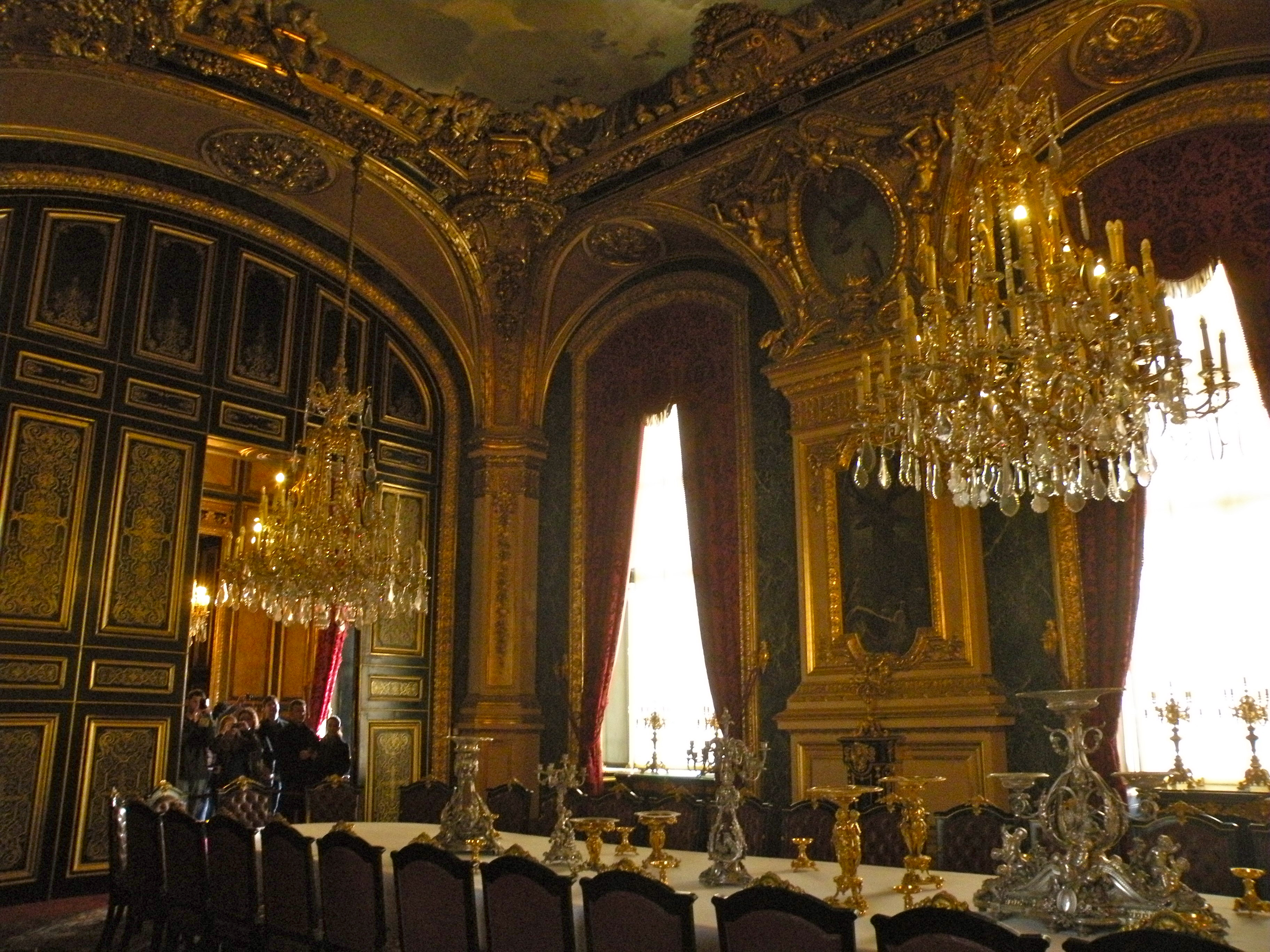
Great Dining Room of the Napoleon III Apartments

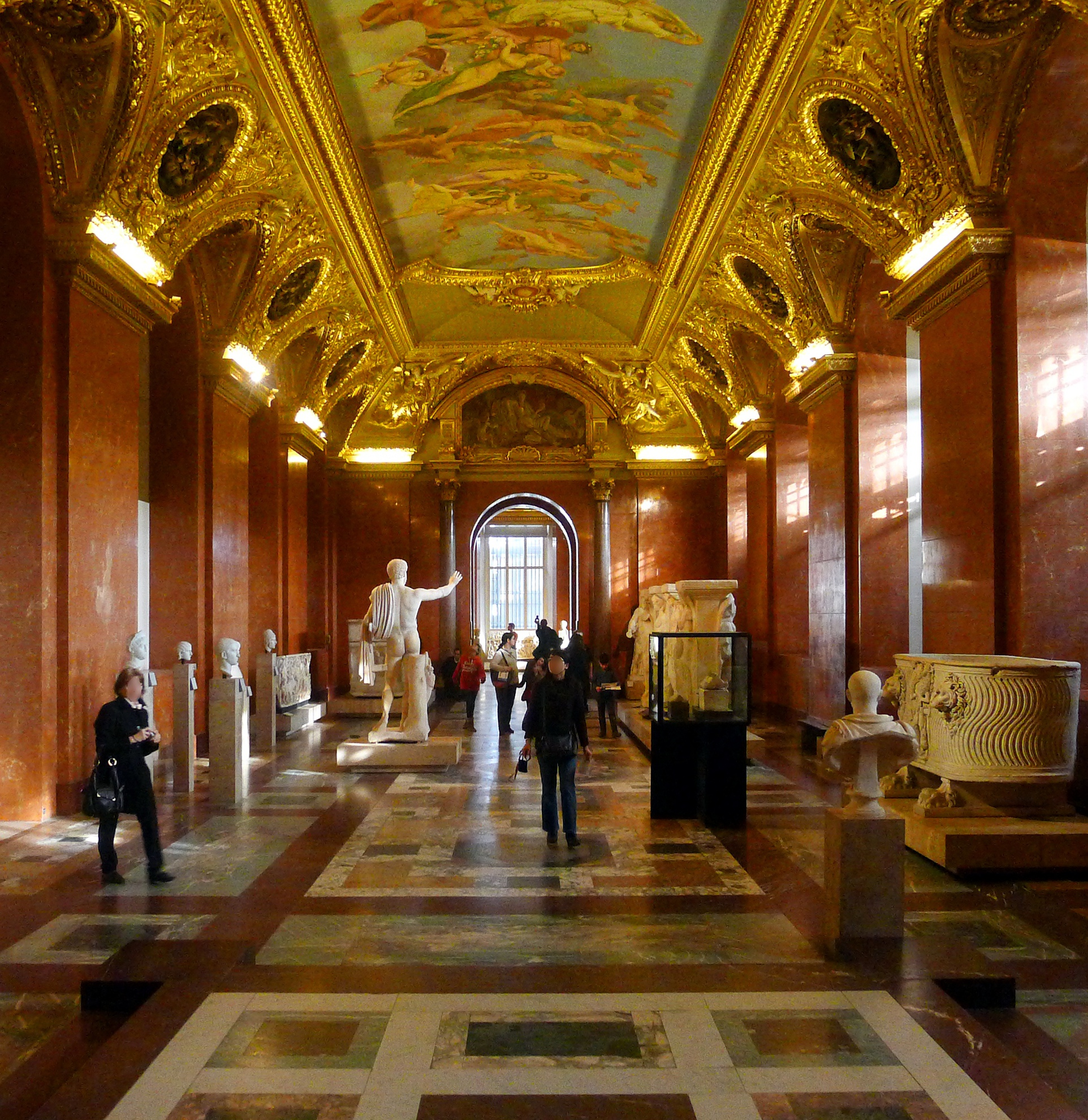
Salle d'Auguste (originally Salle des Empereurs)

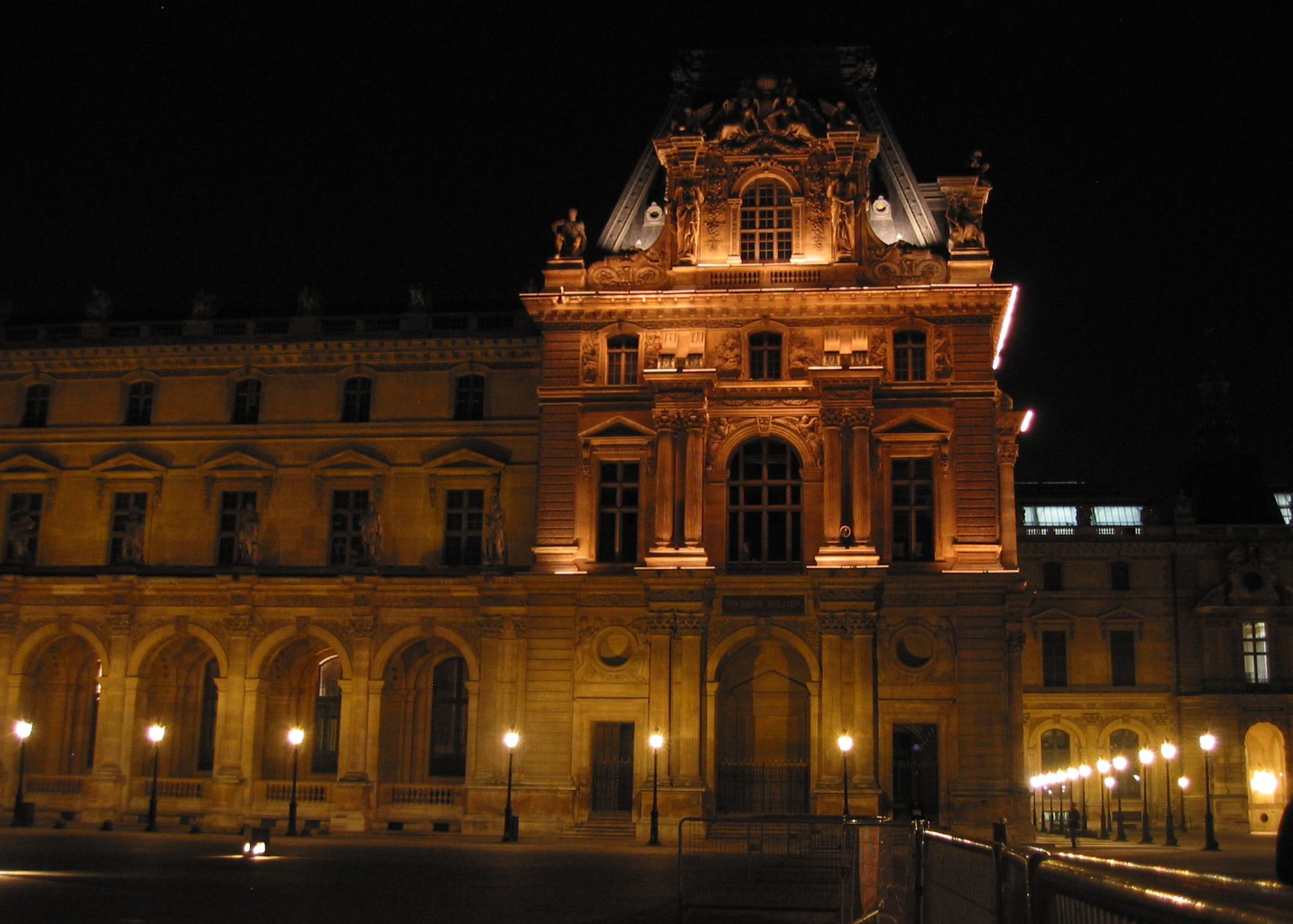
Mollien Pavilion of the Denon Wing

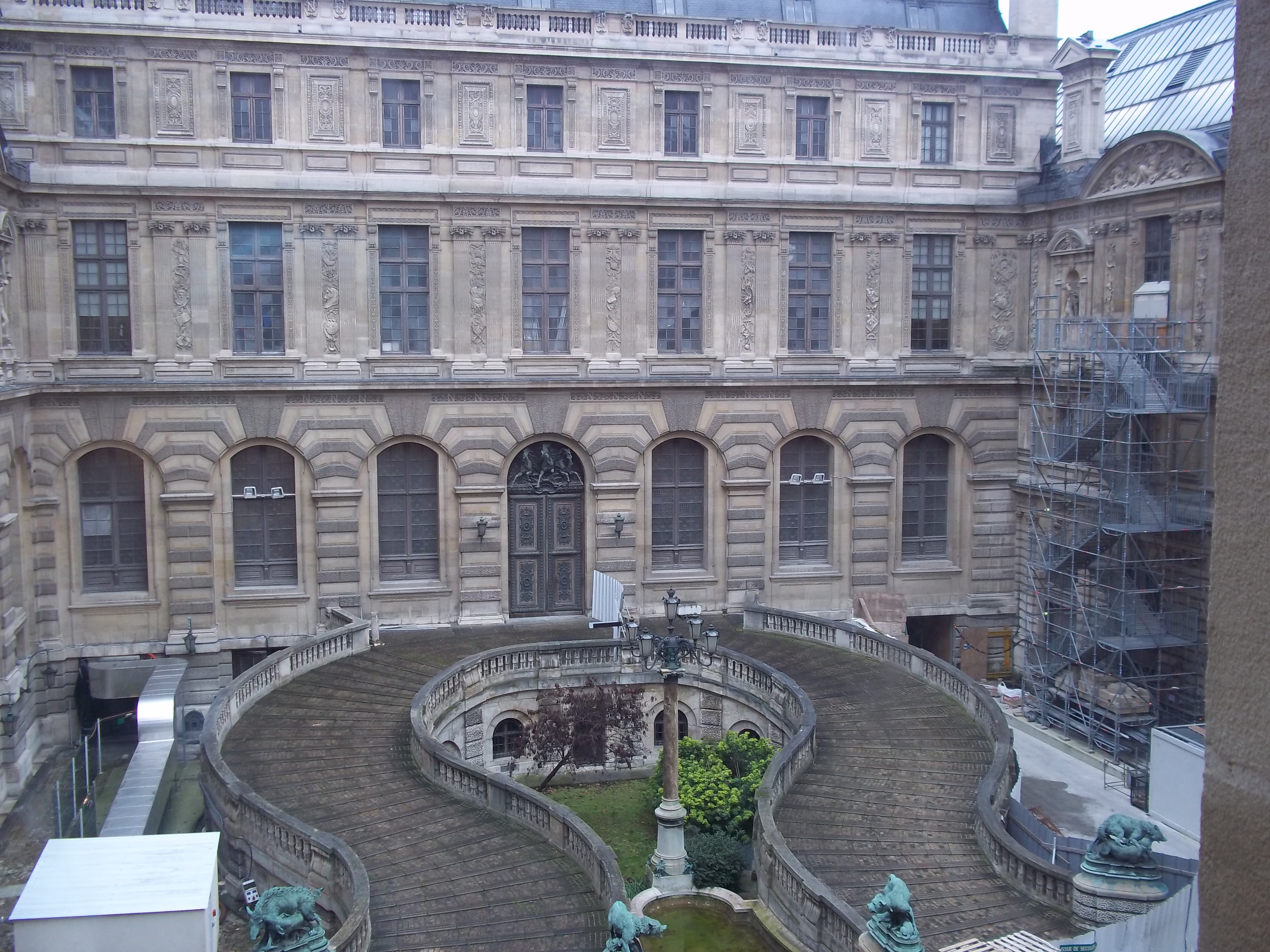
Cour Lefuel (Denon Wing) with horse ramps leading to the former Emperor's Stables

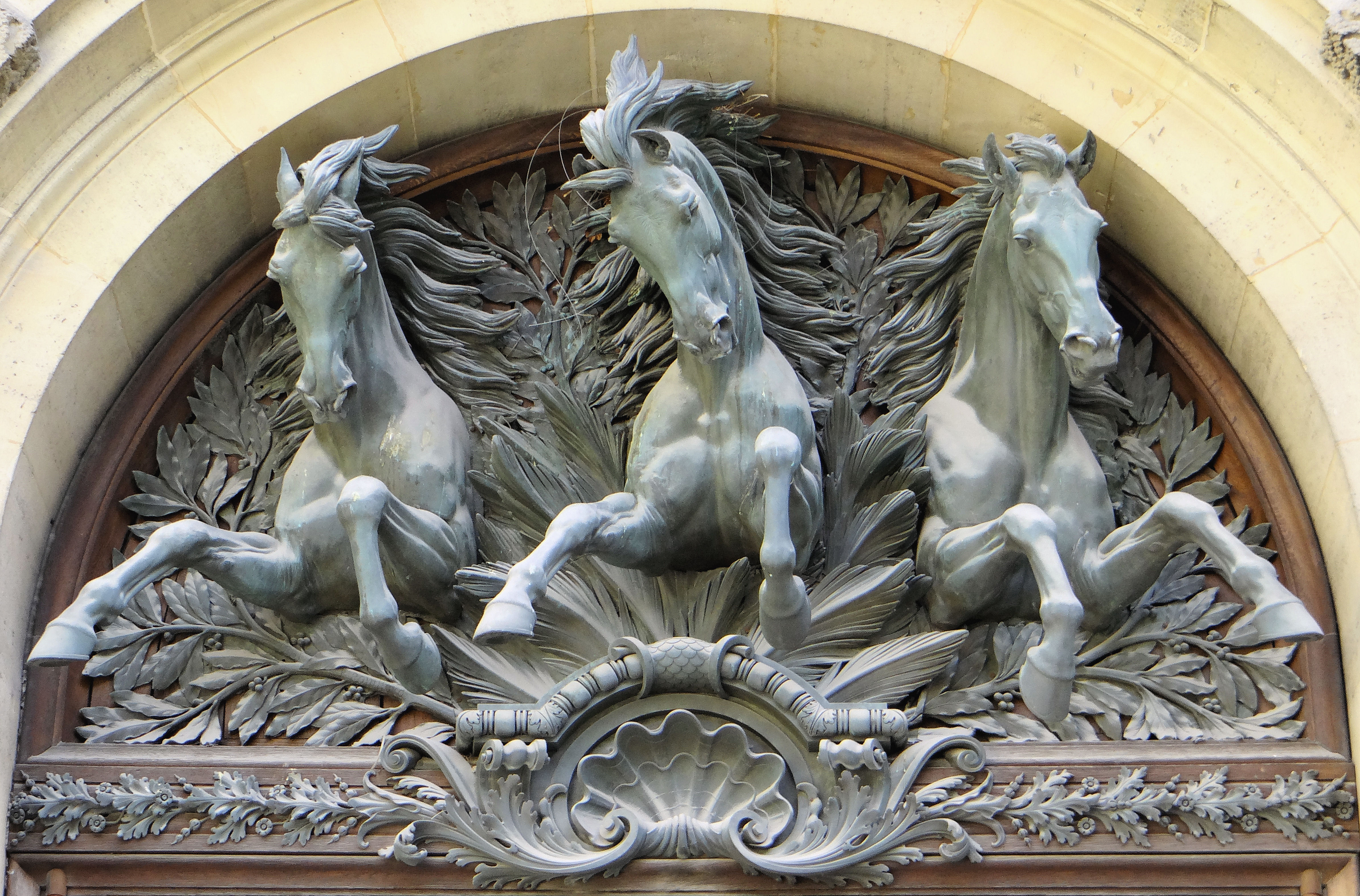
Tympanum over the door to the former stables from the Cour Lefuel

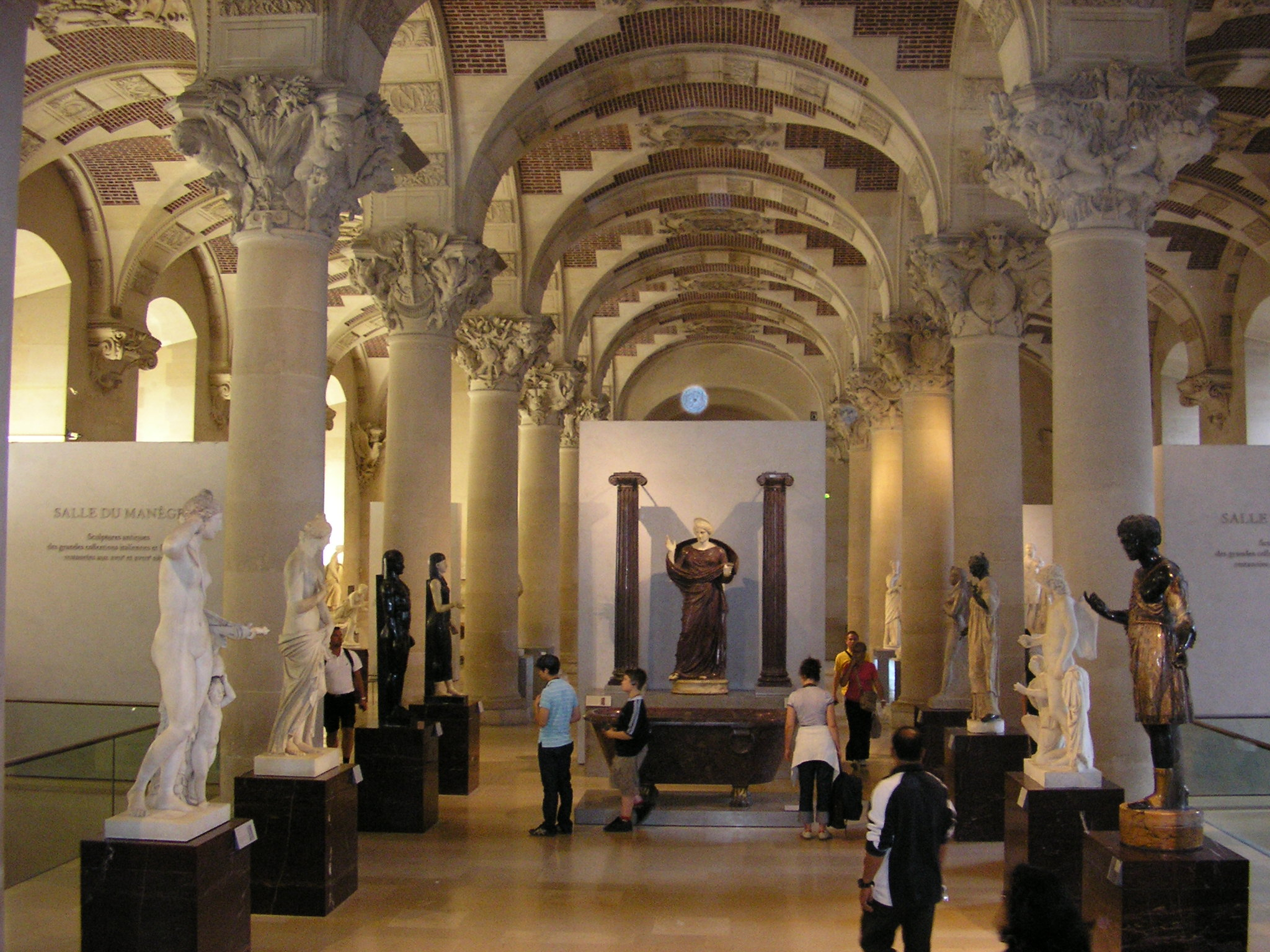
Salle du Manège (former stables)

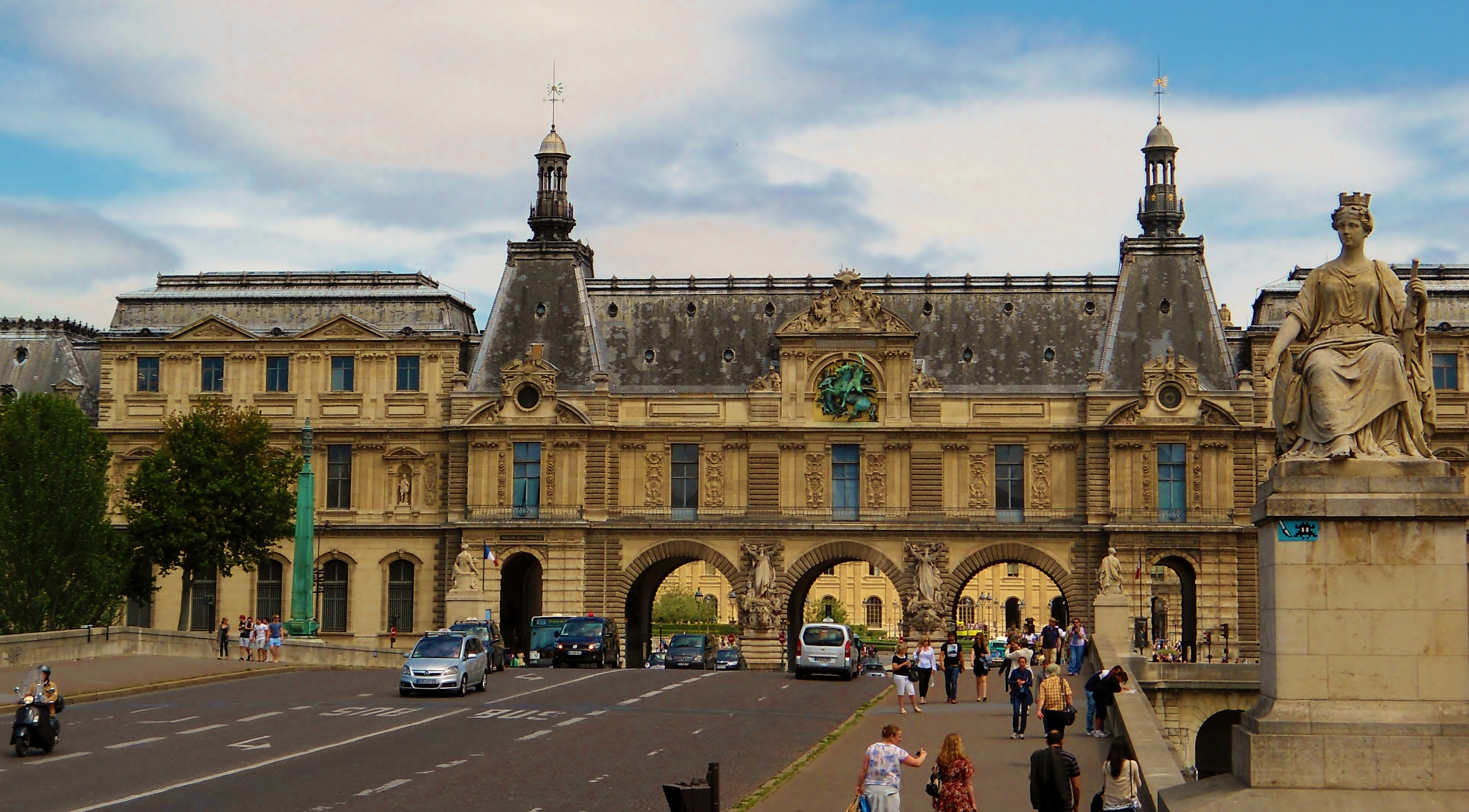
South facade of the Guichets du Carrousel (1861)

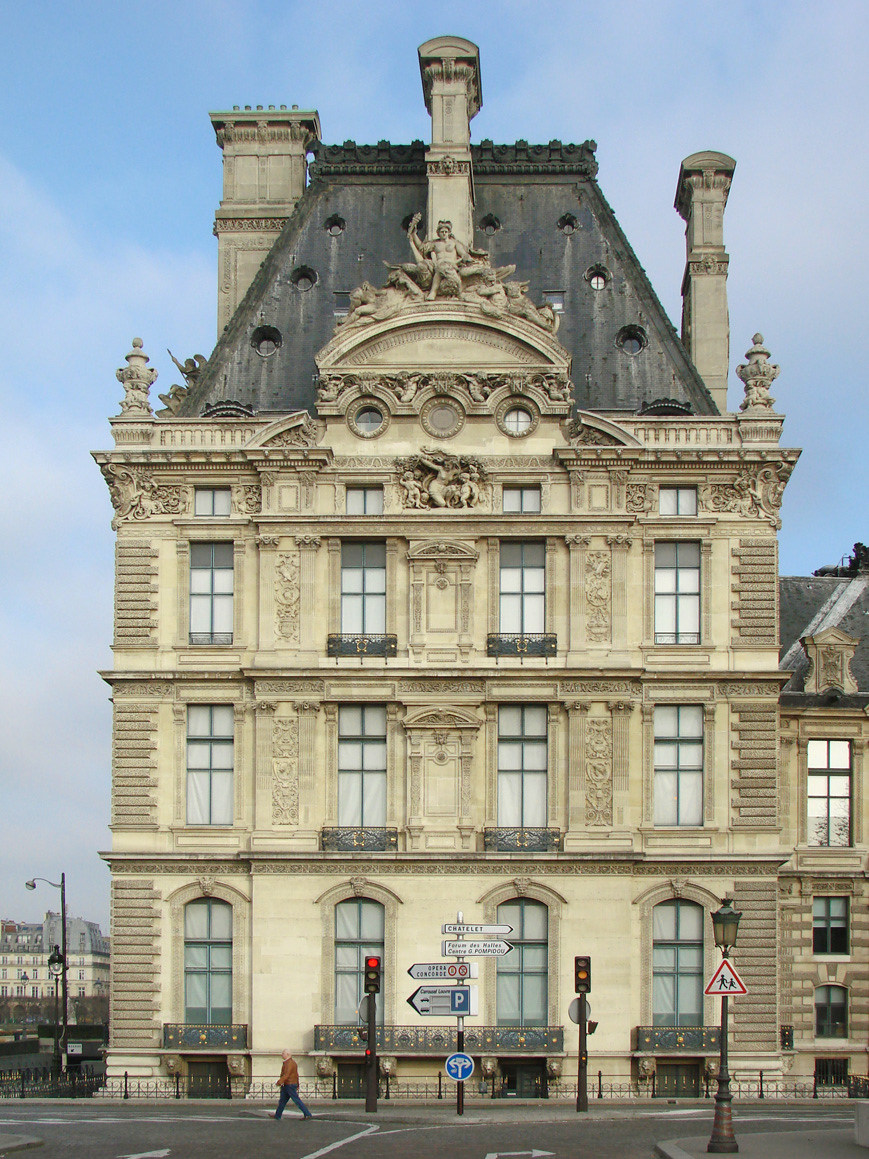
Pavillon de Flore, south facade

== Bibliography ==
- Aulanier, Christiane (1971). Histoire du Palais et du Musée du Louvre: Le Pavillon de Flore. Paris: Éditions des Musées nationaux. OCLC 468520874.
- Bautier, Genevieve Bresc (1995). The Louvre: An Architectural History. New York: The Vendome Press. ISBN 9780865659636.
- Fonkenell, Guillaume (2010). Le Palais des Tuileries. Arles: Honoré Clair. ISBN 9782918371045.
- Hamerton, Philip Gilbert (1885). Paris in Old and Present Times, p. 38.
- Hare, Augustus John (1887). Paris, p. 20. G.Allen.
- Mead, Christopher (1996). "Lefuel, Hector-Martin", vol.19, pp. 69–70 in The Dictionary of Art (reprinted with minor corrections in 1998), edited by Jane Turner. London: Macmillan. ISBN 9780333749395. Online reprint at Oxford Art Online (subscription, Wikipedia Library access or UK public library membership required).
