= Alexis Paccard =

French architect

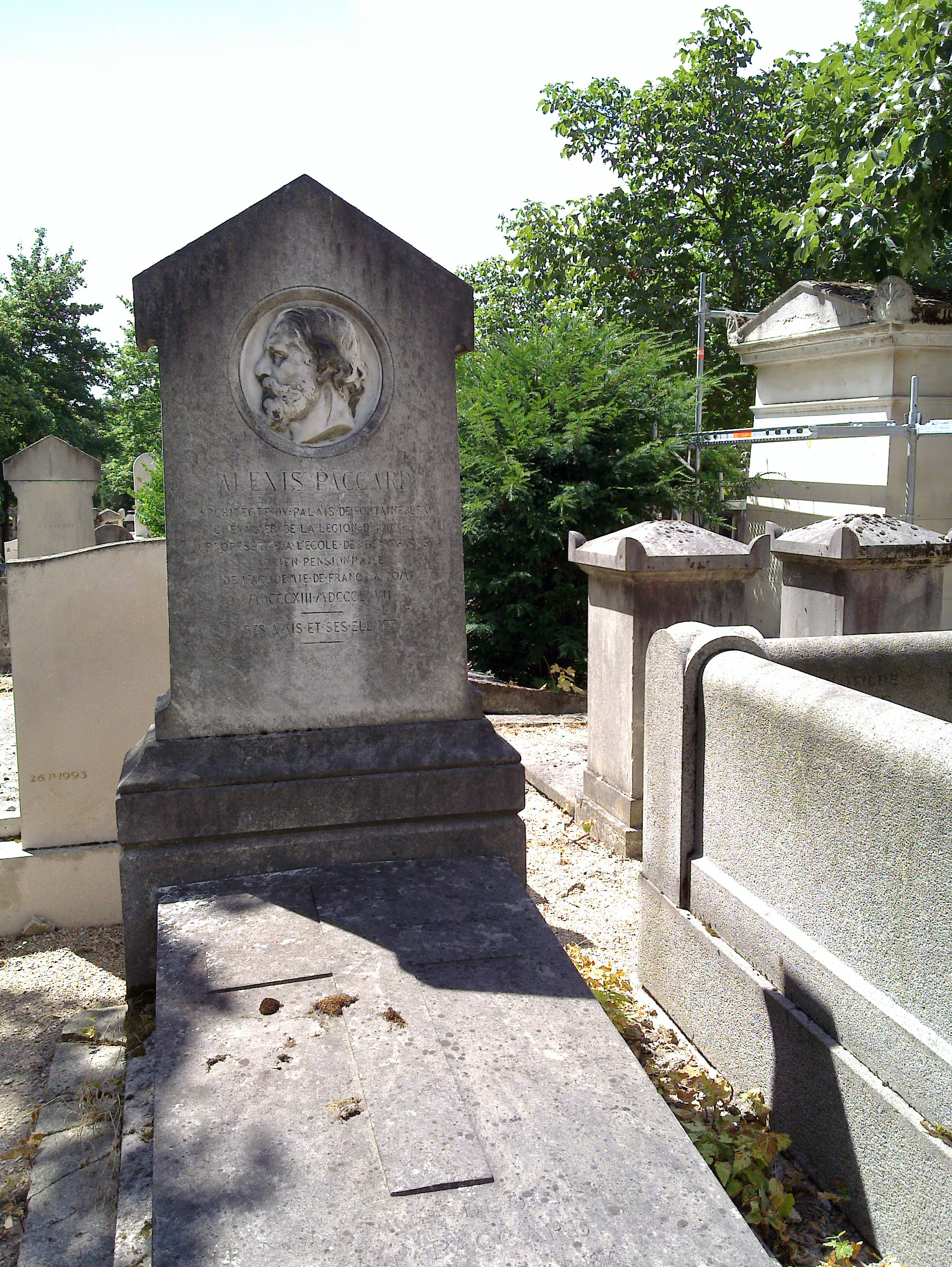
Paccard's grave at the Père Lachaise Cemetery, Paris

Alexis Paccard (12 June 1813 – 18 August 1867) was a French architect.

Paccard entered the École nationale supérieure des Beaux-Arts in Paris in 1830 in the workshops of Louis-Hippolyte Lebas and Jean-Nicolas Huyot. He won the Second Grand Prix in 1835 for a medical school, and won the Prix de Rome in 1841 for a "Palace of an ambassador in a foreign country."

His work includes a study of the Parthenon on the Acropolis of Athens, which also earned him a medal at the Universal Exhibition of 1855.

On his return he became official inspector and architect of public buildings. He worked at the Louvre and the Tuileries under the direction of Louis Visconti. In 1854, he was an architect of the Château de Rambouillet, then Palace of Fontainebleau. In December 1863 he became professor of architecture at the Ecole, and among his students was Albert-Félix-Théophile Thomas.

== See also ==
- List of works by Eugène Guillaume
