= Jean-Nicolas Huyot =

French architect

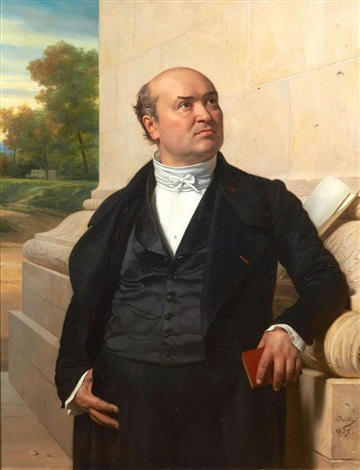
Jean-Nicolas Huyot (1839), portrait by Michel Martin Drolling.

Jean-Nicholas Huyot (English: /uːˈjoʊ/ oo-YOH, French: [ʒɑ̃ nikɔla yjo]; 25 December 1780, Paris – 2 August 1840, Paris) was a French architect, best known for his 1823 continuation of the Arc de Triomphe from the plans of Jean-François Chalgrin.

== Biography ==
Son of a builder, Huyot attended the École nationale supérieure des Beaux-Arts in Paris, and won the Prix de Rome in 1807.

Following his study in Rome, between 1817 and 1821 Huyot traveled in Asia Minor, Egypt, and Greece. He developed significant credentials as an antiquarian. He was part of the Cléopâtra expedition under Louis Nicolas Philippe Auguste de Forbin in 1817, and Huyot sent to Jean-François Champollion a collection of inscriptions he found in the temple of Ramses II at Abu Simbel; this contribution was helpful in Champollion's work in deciphering hieroglyphics. Huyot also provided technical archeological assistance to the Fine Arts section of the French scientific Morea expedition into Greece in 1823.

In 1822 Huyot was elected a member of the Academy of Fine Arts of the Institut de France. Among his architectural students were Swiss architect Melchior Berri, Hector Lefuel, Alexis Paccard, Jean-Louis Victor Grisart, and Jean-Charles Danjoy.

Beginning in 1823 Huyot began presenting lectures in classical architectural history at the École des Beaux-Arts, lectures that influenced a group of self-stylized "romantic" architectural students including Félix Duban, Henri Labrouste, Léon Vaudoyer and Louis Duc. This group in turn was influential in establishing neo-Classicism as a style in mid-19th Century France.

At his death he bequeathed to the National Library a large collection of drawings and plans. He was buried in the cemetery of Père-Lachaise (8th division).
