= Pierre Lescot =

French architect (c. 1515–1578)

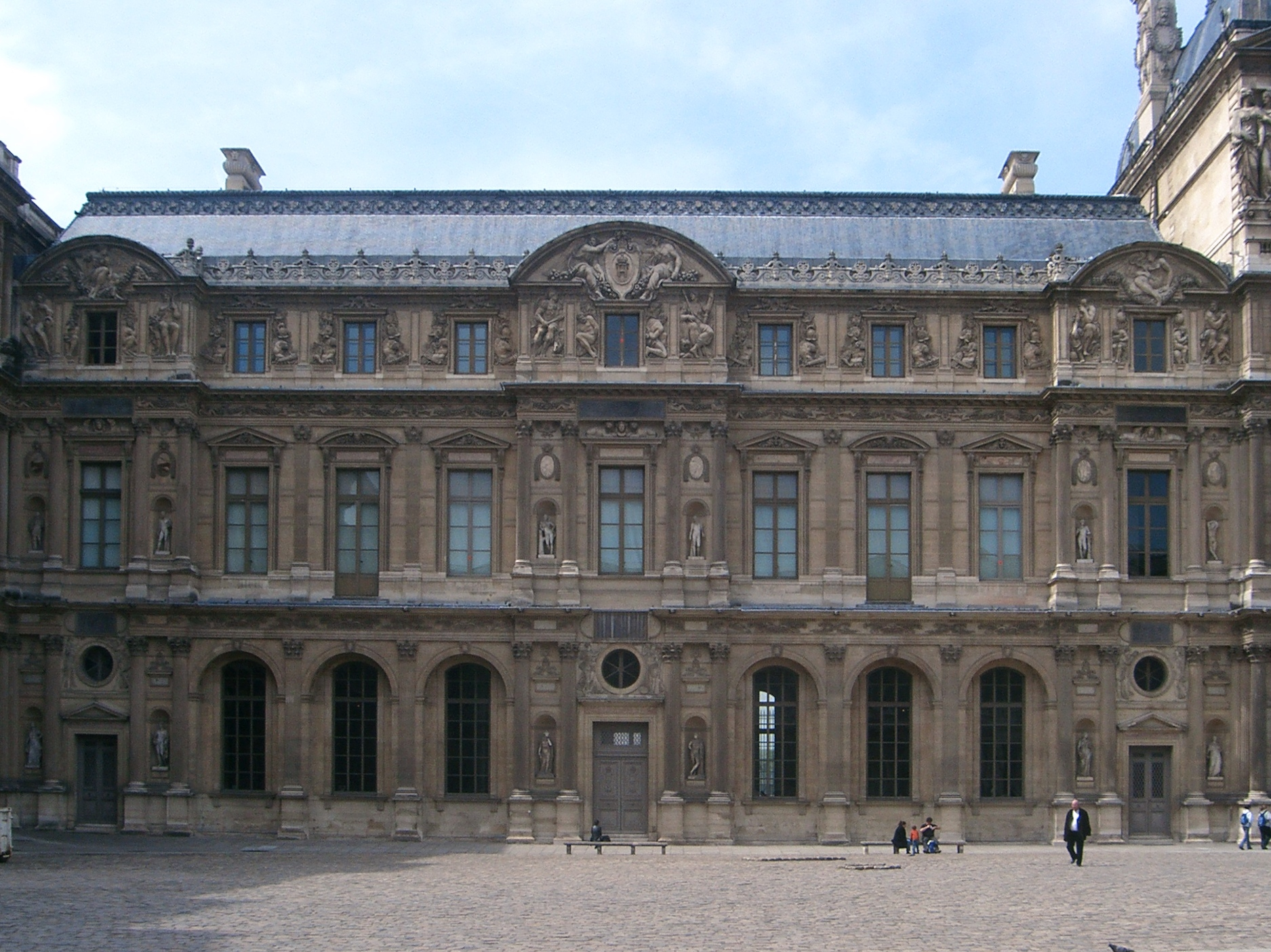
The Lescot Wing of the Palais du Louvre

Pierre Lescot (French: [pjɛʁ lɛsko]; c. 1515 – 10 September 1578) was a French architect of the French Renaissance period. He is known for designing the Fontaine des Innocents and the Lescot wing of the Louvre in Paris. Lescot contributed to the incorporation of classical architectural elements into French architecture.

== Biography ==
Lescot was born in Paris. King Francis I of France appointed him as the architect responsible for building projects at the Palais du Louvre, transforming the old château into the renowned palace. A design proposed by the Italian architect and theorist Sebastiano Serlio was set aside in favor of Lescot's plan. His design envisioned enclosing three sides of a square courtyard with elaborate apartments, while the eastern side, facing the city as it then stood, was likely intended to be lightly enclosed with an arcade. Festive corner pavilions of impressive height, adorned with pillars and statues, were planned to replace the medieval towers. However, elsewhere in the Louvre, little progress was made beyond demolishing parts of the old feudal structure.

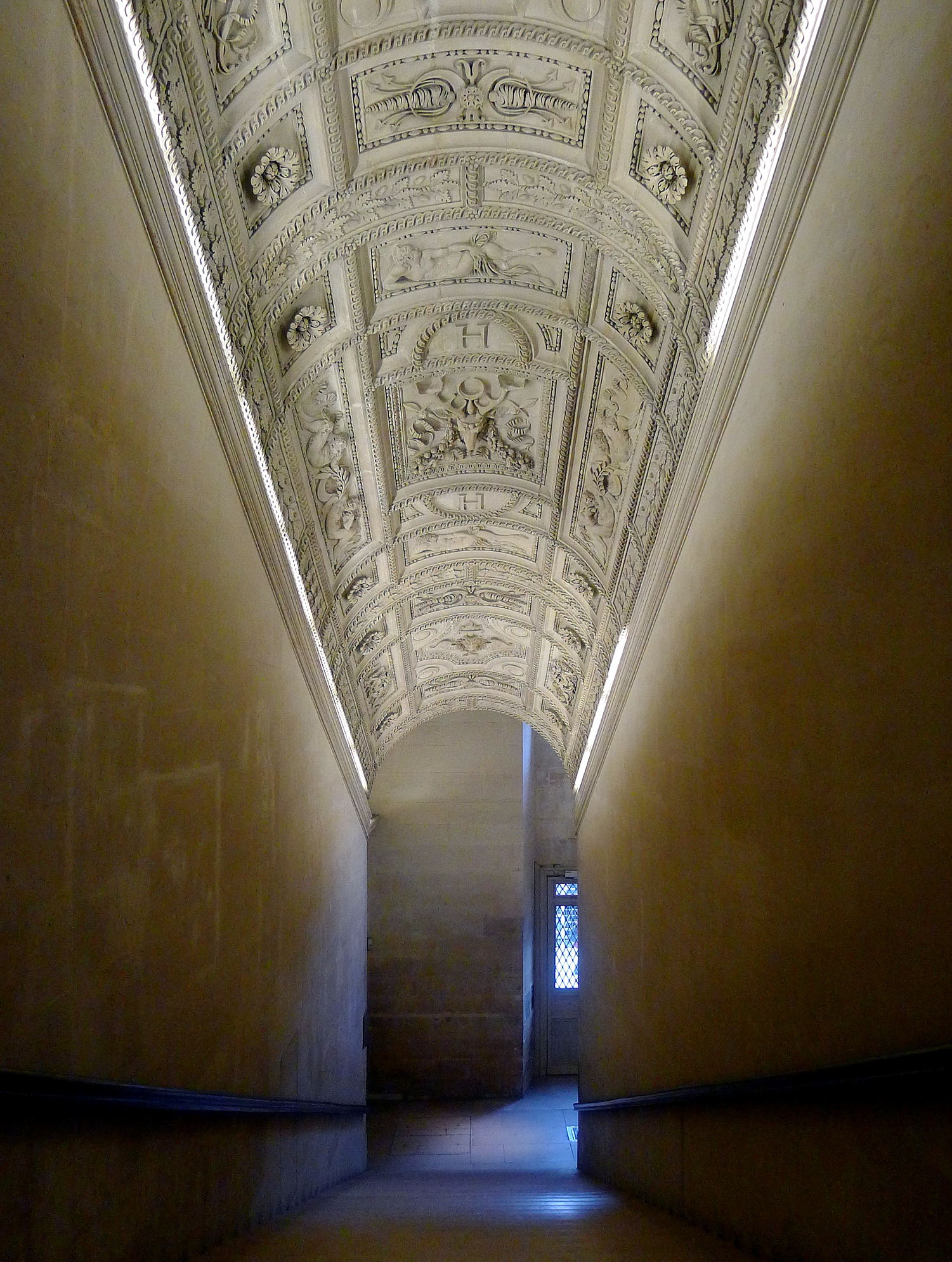
The Henri II staircase at the north end of the Lescot Wing of the Louvre

After the death of King Francis I, Lescot was confirmed in his role by his successor, Henry II, and continued working on the Louvre project until his death. Despite this, only the west side and part of the south side were completed, forming the present southwest wing of the Cour Carré, known as the Aile Lescot, or "Lescot Wing" (illustration). Constructed between 1546 and 1551, this structure set the standard for French classicism.

The wing features two stories with an attic adorned with Jean Goujon's richly detailed bas-relief panels and is topped by a sloping roof, a traditional French architectural element suited to a rainy climate. The ground floor's deeply recessed arch-headed windows create the impression of an arcade, while the central and end pavilions project outward, each crowned by small round oeil de boeuf windows. On the second floor, slender fluted pilasters divide the windows, which alternate between triangular and arched pediments.

Goujon's sculptural work and architectural decorations are skillfully integrated into the overall design. The ground-floor Salle des Caryatides (1546–1549), named for Goujon's four caryatid figures supporting the musicians' gallery, is a notable surviving feature. Other remnants of Lescot's contributions to the Louvre include the Salle des Gardes and the Henry II staircase.

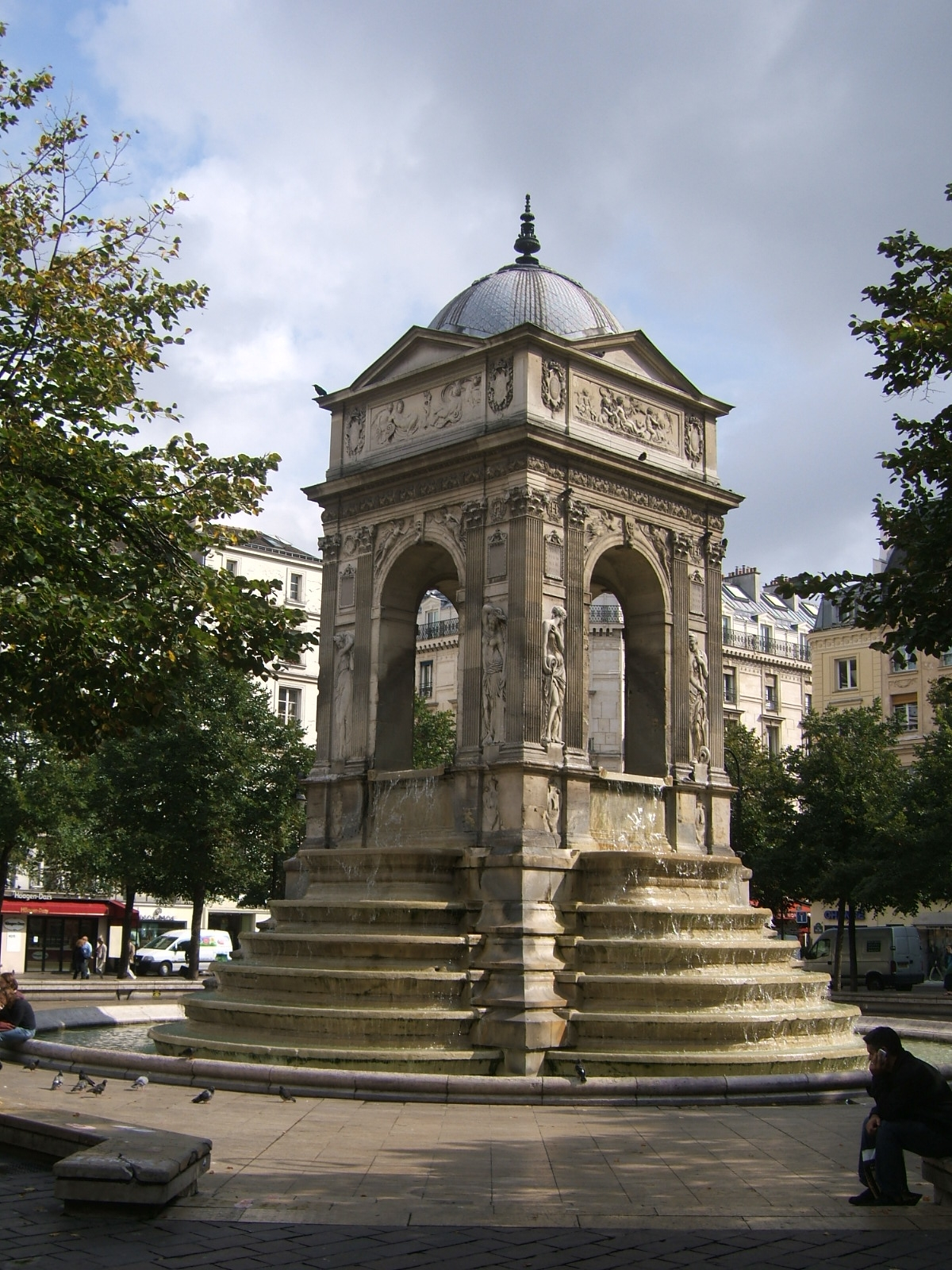
Lescot's Fontaine des nymphes 1549, rededicated as Fontaine des innocents

Lescot's earliest works, completed between 1540 and 1545, included the rood screen at Saint-Germain l'Auxerrois, though only some sculptures by Jean Goujon have survived. In Paris, he designed the Hôtel de Ligneris (1548–1550), now known as the Musée Carnavalet, which was later extensively modified by François Mansart.

In the Fountain of Nymphs (1547–1549), Lescot’s architectural contributions play a more subdued role compared to the prominence of Goujon's sculptures. Lescot was also responsible for the design of the Château de Vallery.

Lescot's career is poorly documented, leaving it uncertain whether he ever visited Italy or if his understanding of Italian architectural practices came solely from the architecture and engravings associated with the School of Fontainebleau. All of Lescot's known works feature sculptural decoration by Trebatti and Jean Goujon, who collaborated with him on the Louvre.

Unlike many architects of the French Flamboyant Gothic and Renaissance periods, Lescot did not come from a lineage of masons with practical experience. Instead, he was the son of a seigneur. His father, also named Pierre Lescot, was the sieur of Lissy-en-Brie and Clagny, near Versailles—lands that Lescot inherited.

According to a eulogistic poem by Ronsard, Lescot devoted his early youth to drawing and painting and, after the age of twenty, turned his attention to mathematics and architecture. However, his wealth and official responsibilities seem to have limited his artistic pursuits later in life. Beyond his recognized works, no other documented projects are attributed to him. A dismissive mention in the memoirs of the duc de Nevers, published long after Lescot's death, refers to "Magny" (likely Clagny) as "a painter who used to make inventions of masquerades and tourneys," reflecting the expectation for court architects of the 15th to 17th centuries to design such spectacles.

Upon Lescot's death, Jean Baptiste Androuet du Cerceau succeeded him as the architect of the Louvre.

== See also ==
- Architecture of Paris
- Cour Carrée
- French Renaissance architecture

Other outstanding architects of the French Renaissance:

- Philibert Delorme
- Jean Bullant
- Androuet du Cerceau, a dynasty of designers and architects
- Jean Goujon
