= Lescot Wing =

Wing of the Louvre Palace

Coordinates: 48°51′36.95″N 2°20′15.08″E

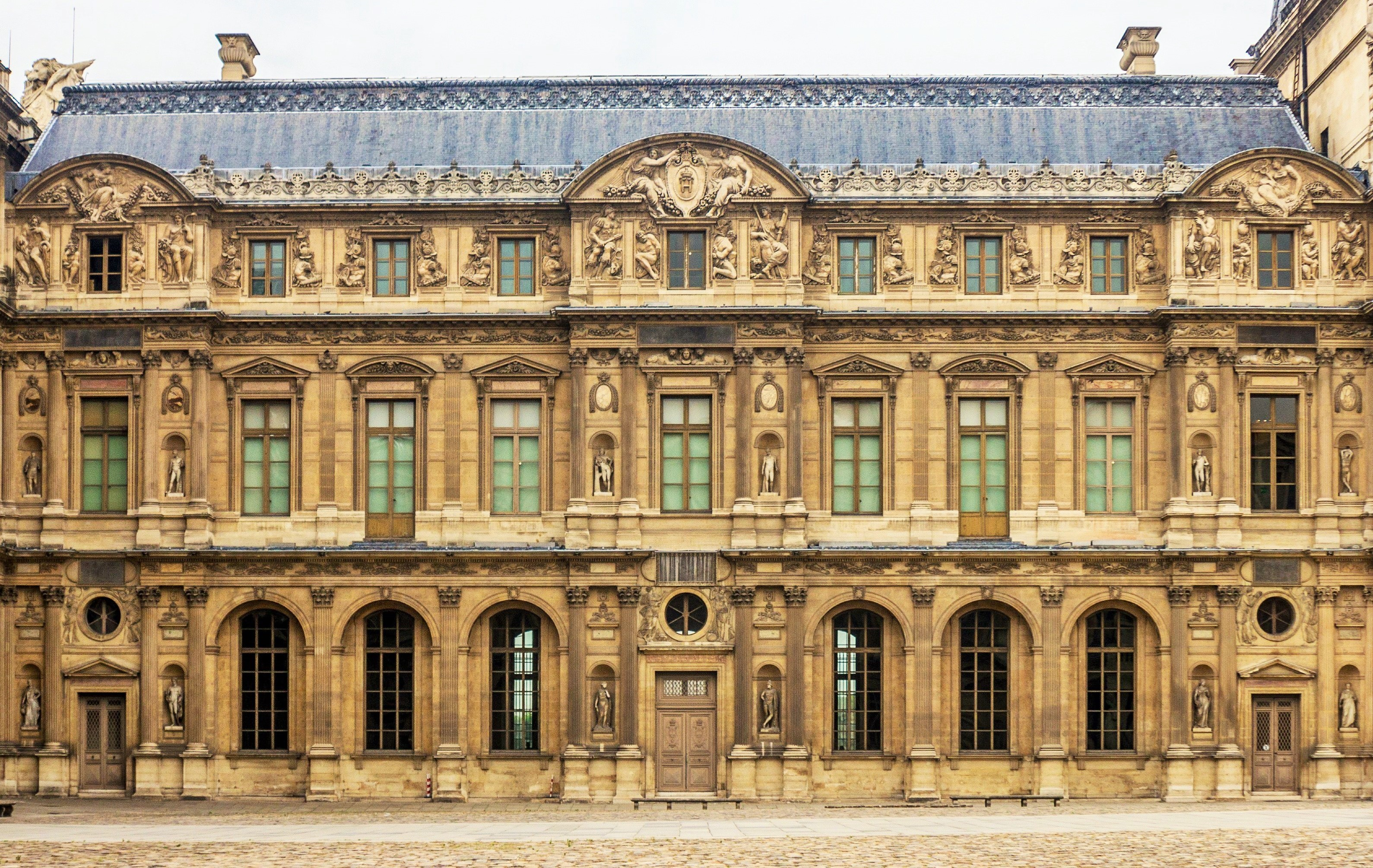
The Lescot Wing of the Louvre Palace

The Lescot Wing (Aile Lescot in French, also Aile Henri II) is the oldest preserved structure above ground of the Louvre Palace in Paris, France. It was designed by architect Pierre Lescot and built between 1546 and 1551. Its architecture is influenced by Italian Mannerism. It had seminal influence on what became the Parisian Renaissance style, and beyond it, French architectural classicism.

King Francis I appointed architect Pierre Lescot (1510–1578) to lead all building projects at the Louvre Palace. Lescot's role was reconfirmed following Francis's death by his son and successor Henry II; Lescot kept working on the Louvre project until his death, completing the Lescot Wing in 1551, the Pavillon du Roi, and the western section of the southern wing of the Cour Carrée.

== Exterior ==
The wing's façade on the court side, now the Cour Carrée, consists of two main stories (ground floor and first floor) plus an attic richly decorated with Jean Goujon's bas-relief sculptures. It is crowned by a sloping or Mansard roof, which had considerable influence on the subsequent development of French architecture, including the later work of François Mansart which gave his name to the roof profile. The deeply recessed arch-headed windows of the ground story form an arcade, while the projecting pavilions bear small round oeil de bœuf windows above them. In the second storey slender fluted pilasters separate the windows, which alternate triangular and arched pediments. Goujon's sculpture and architectural ornaments are subordinated to the construction.

The eastern façade was comprehensively renovated in the early 1980s and inaugurated by President François Mitterrand, together with the rest of the cleaned-up Cour Carrée, on 24 February 1986.

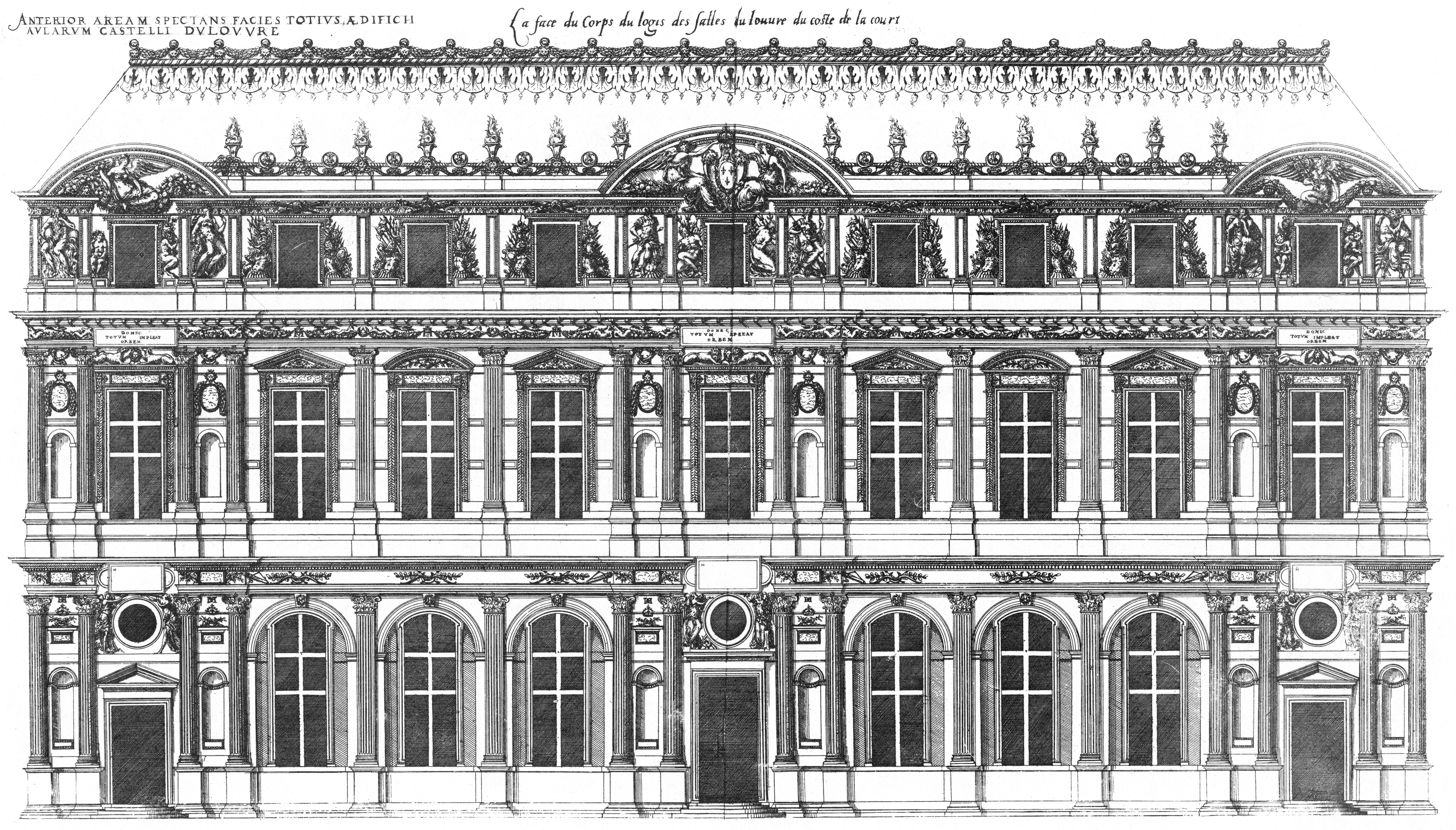
Lescot's façade illustrated in Les Plus Excellents Bâtiments de France (1576) by Jacques I Androuet du Cerceau

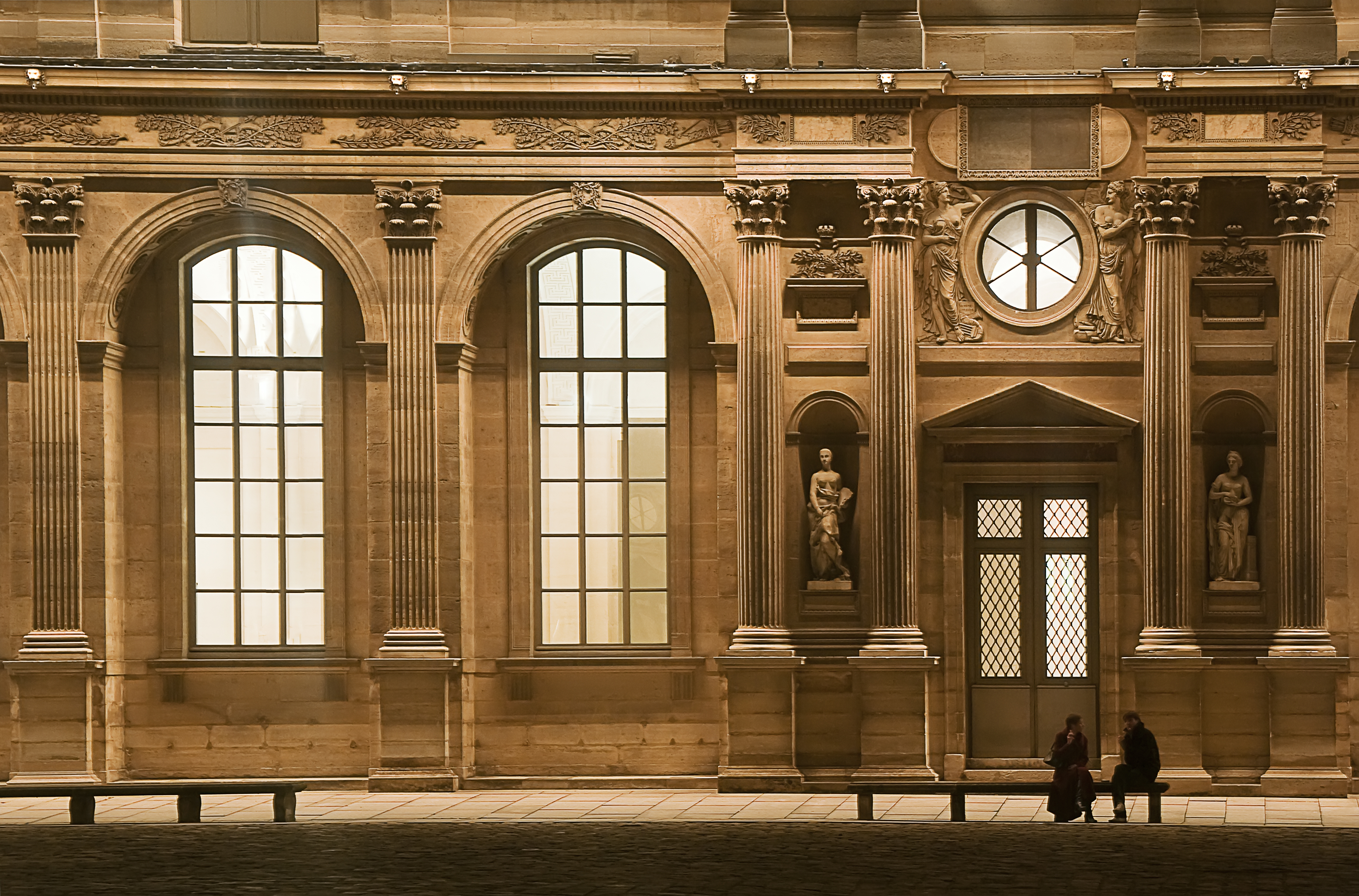
Detail of ground floor's decoration, as illuminated by night

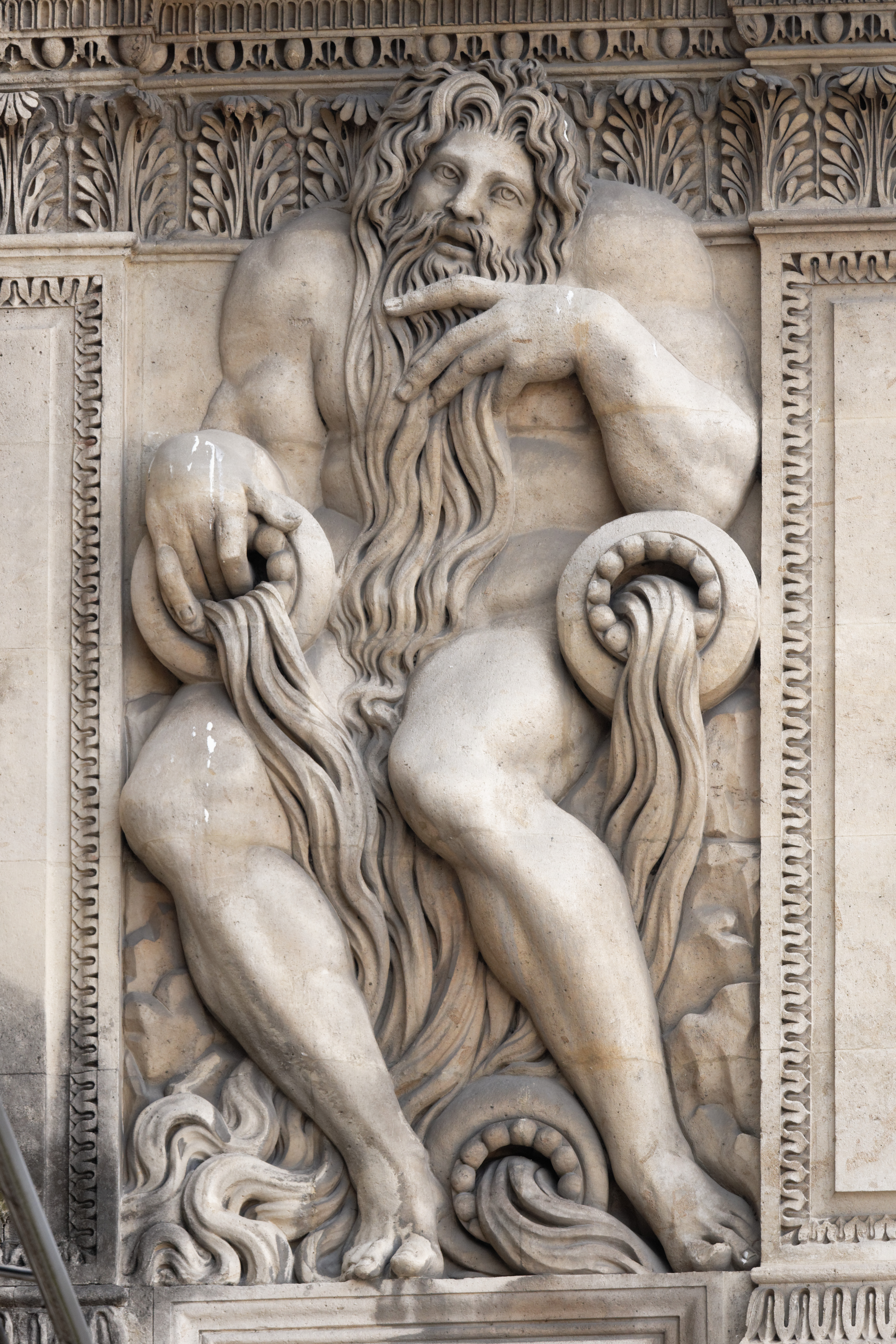
Water, by Jean Goujon

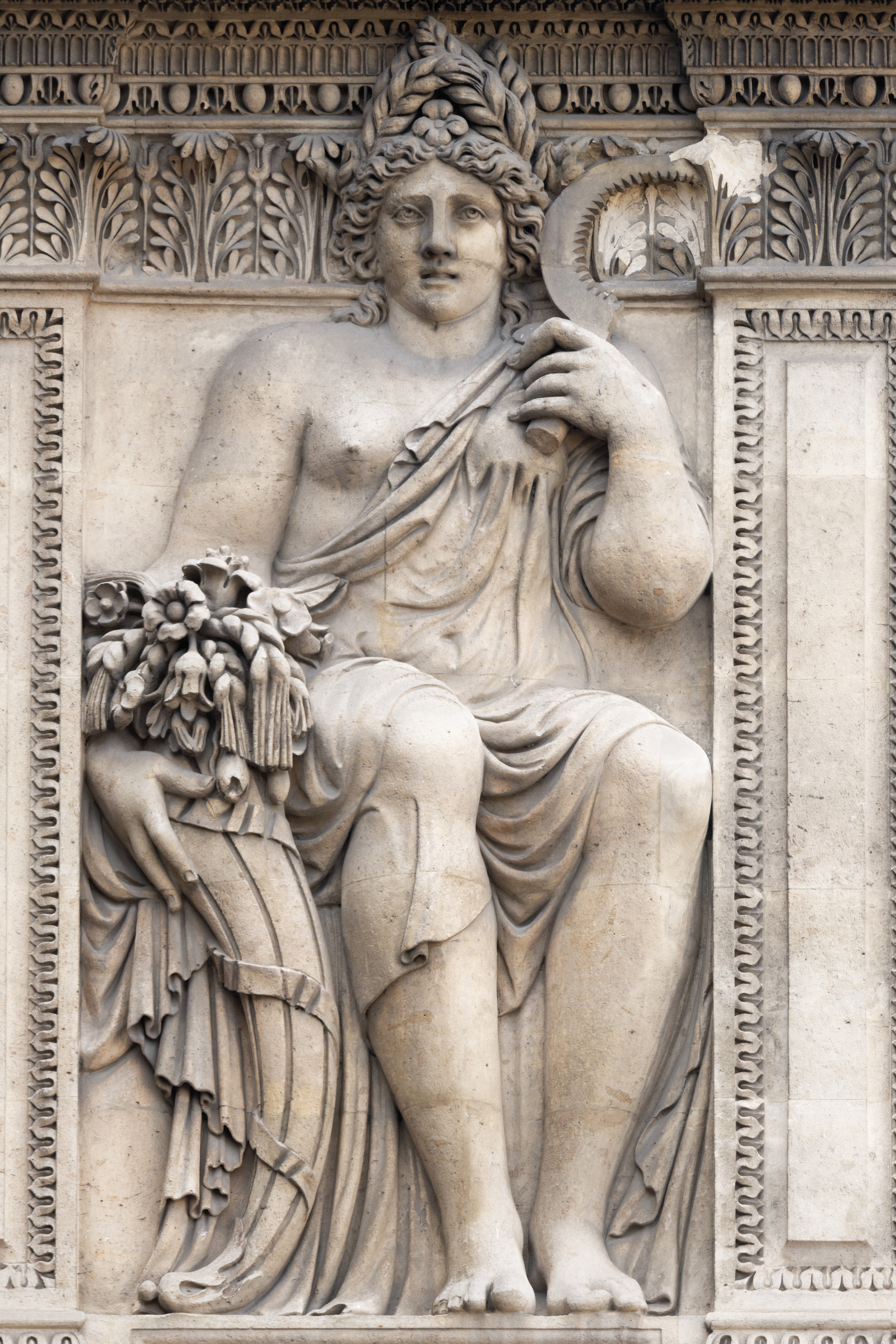
Ceres, by Goujon

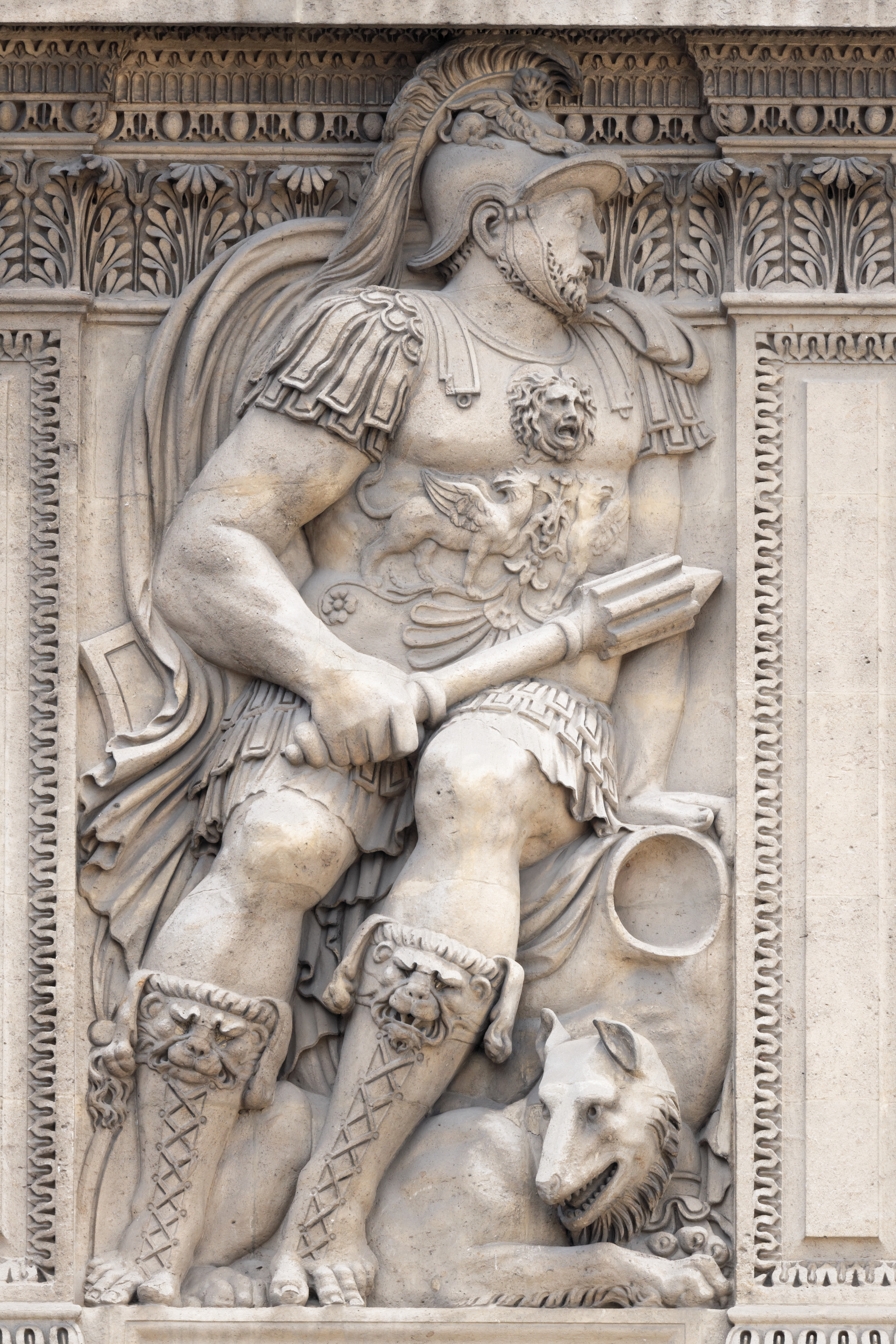
Mars, by Goujon

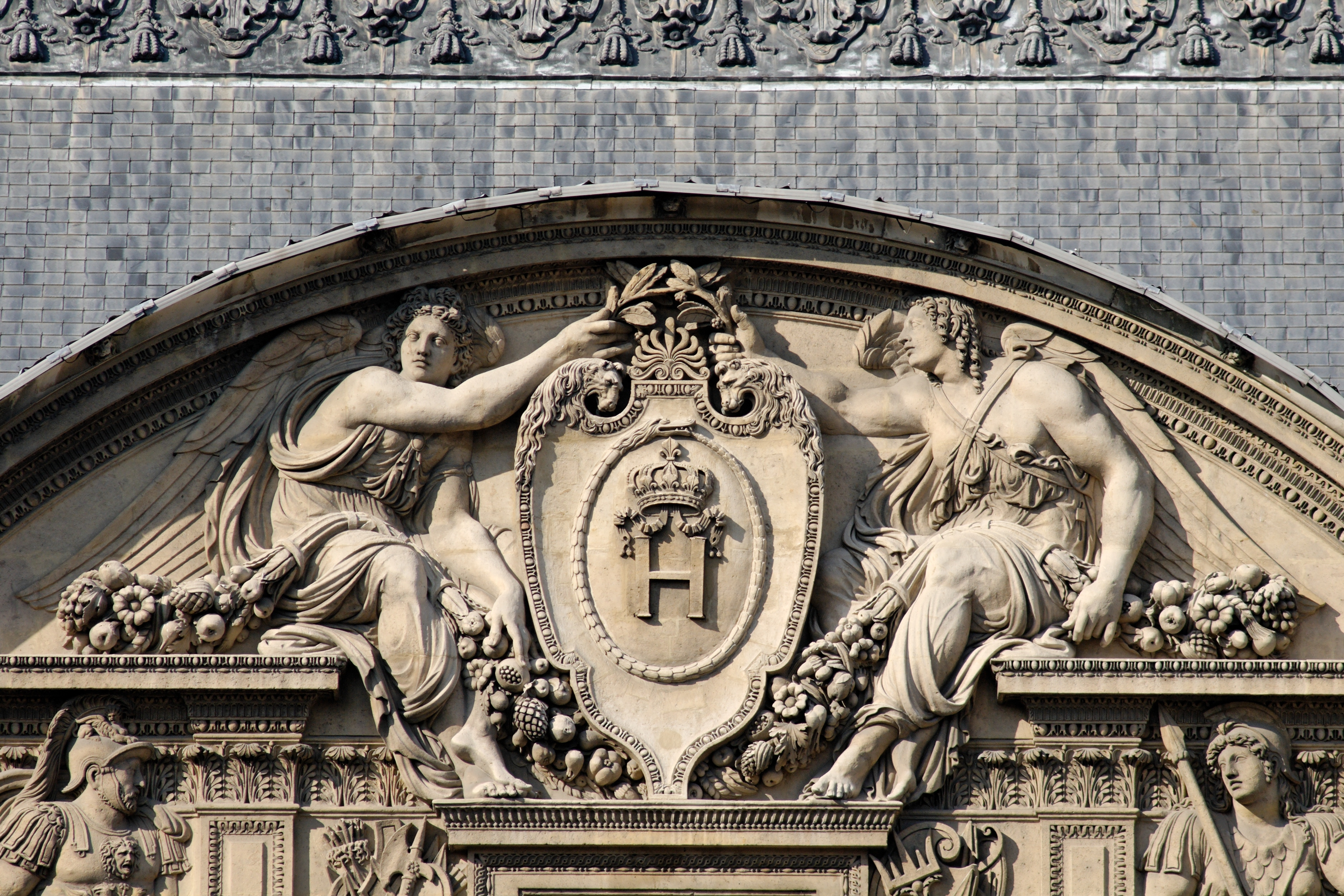
Central pediment by Goujon: two angels bearing Henry II's monogram

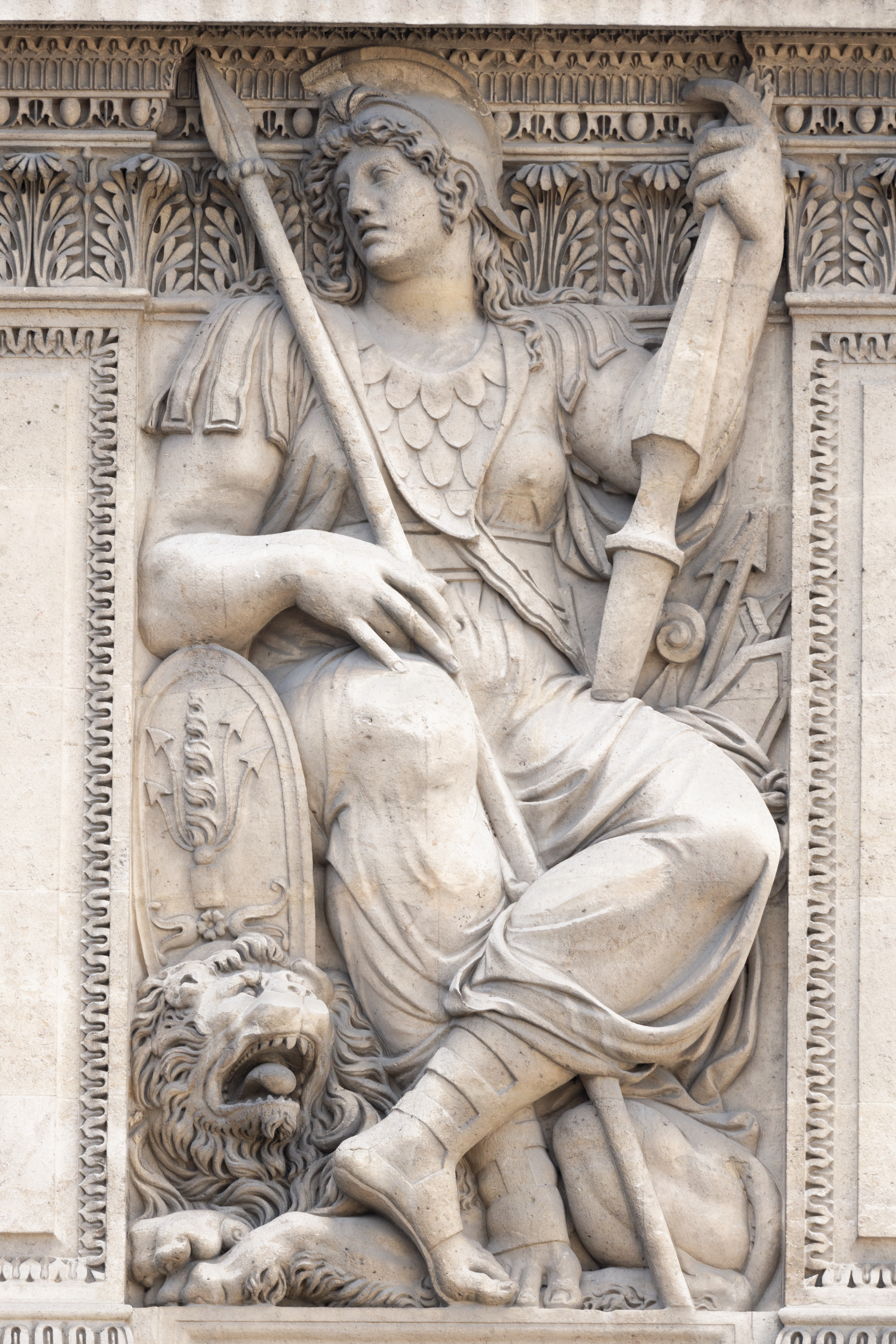
Bellona, by Goujon

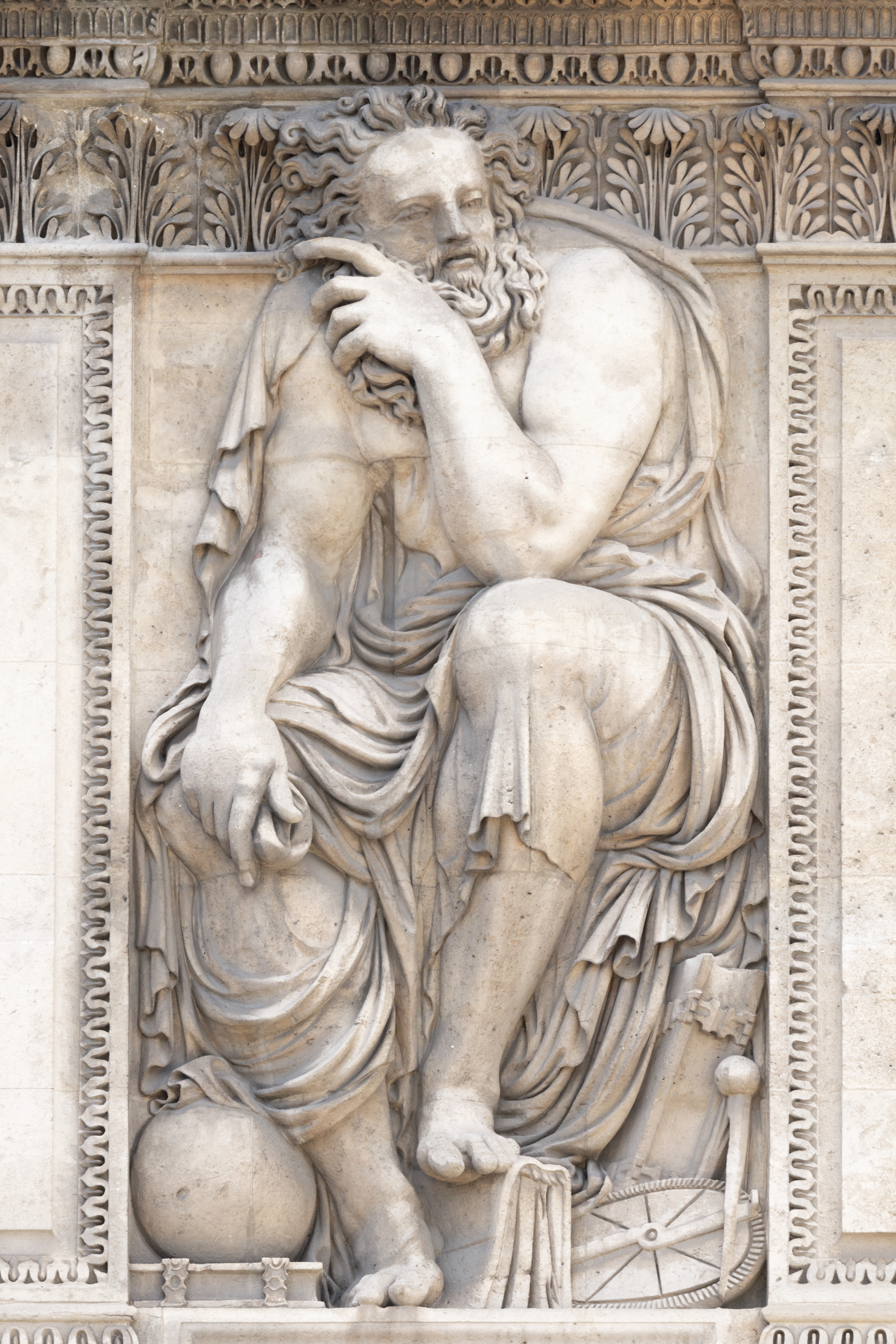
Archimedes, by Goujon

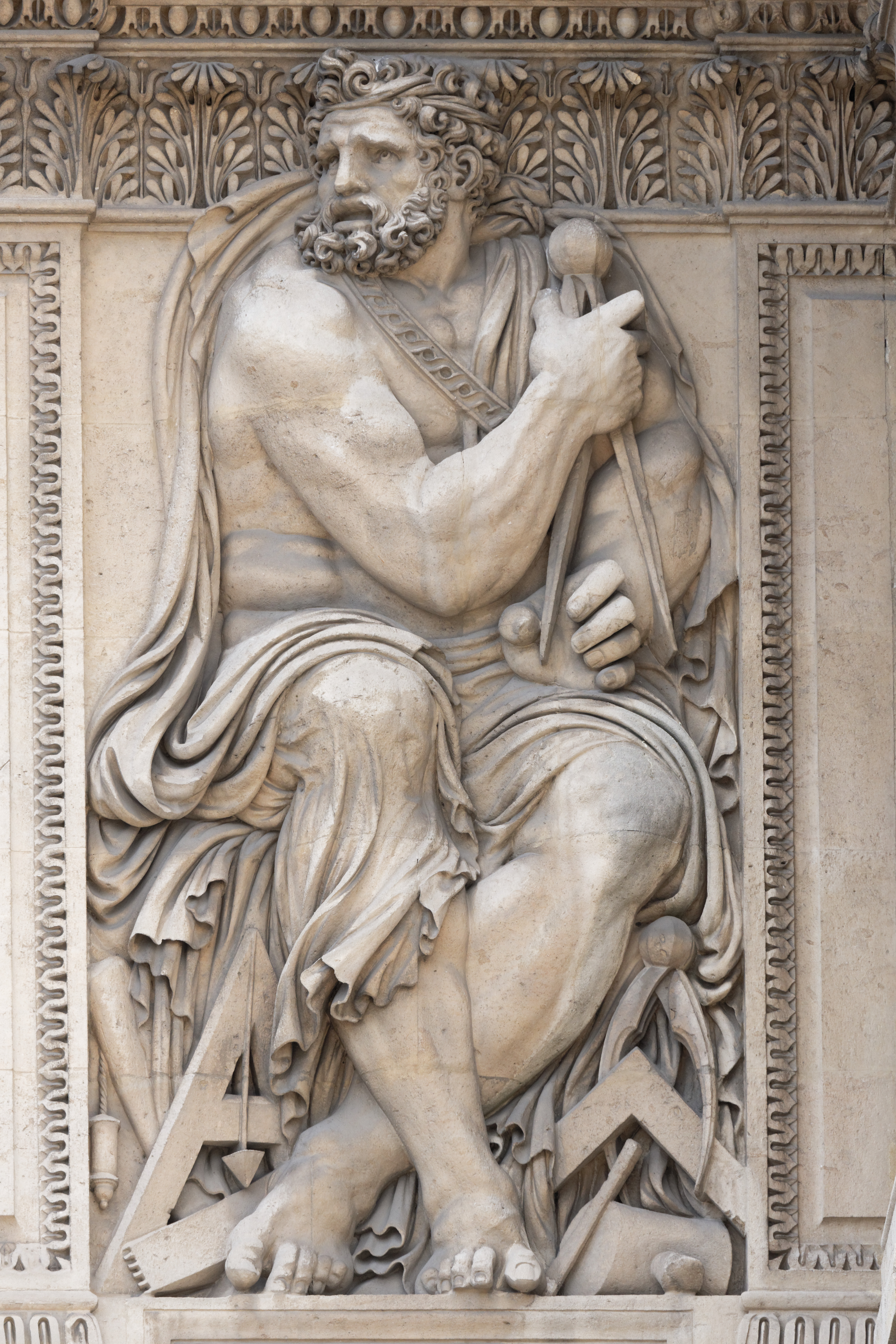
Euclid, by Goujon

== Interior ==
Both the ground floor and the first floor include major ceremonial spaces or Great Halls that played a significant symbolic and practical role in the operation of the French monarchy for more than a century after their initial construction.

=== Ground floor ===
The Lower Great Hall (Grande Salle basse), now known as Hall of the Caryatids (French: Salle des Caryatides), first completed in 1549, replaced what had been the Great Hall of the Medieval Louvre built in the 13th century. The former adjacent chapel's footprint was kept as a semi-separated space on the southern end, known since as the "tribunal", whose floor was originally slightly higher than the rest. On the room's northern end, Goujon created a tribune or minstrels' gallery supported by four caryatid figures inspired by classical precedents (not directly by those of the Erechtheion in Athens, which were not known in Renaissance France, but presumably by ancient Roman copies thereof). The original ceiling, supported by wooden beams, had to be propped up as early as the reign of Henry IV; in 1638, that wooden ceiling was replaced by the current stone vault supported by pillars decorated with columns, designed by Jacques Lemercier. The sculpted decoration thereof was completed around 1806-1808 by Percier and Fontaine, who removed the difference of floor level between the "tribunal" and the rest of the room. The room was used for multiple festivities and ceremonies, including the mourning of King Henry IV from 10 to 26 June 1610, and a ritual foot washing of thirteen paupers performed by Louis XIV on Maundy Thursday.

=== First floor ===
The Upper Great Hall (Grande Salle haute), long known as the Salle La Caze as it hosted the collection donated by Louis La Caze in 1870 and now (since 2021) used for the display of Etruscan art, was used for numerous royal ceremonies and functions. In the 18th century, it was partitioned and the various rooms thus created were used by the Academies and other institutions. The large room was recreated in the late 1810s and merged with the attic to form a vast ceremonial space, with an upper gallery for the public, that was used for the joint opening sessions of France's two legislative chambers (first on 9 December 1820) and correspondingly known as salle des Etats or salle des séances. In 1864, Hector-Martin Lefuel renovated the room for museum use, including a skylight in the ceiling, after a new salle des Etats had been created in Napoleon III's Louvre expansion. During the 1930s, Louvre architect Albert Ferran recreated the attic to expand the Louvre's exhibition spaces and redecorated the room, thus brought back to its 16th-century height and volume, in a stripped Classicism style, keeping Percier and Fontaine's triumphal-arch-shaped structures at both ends of the room and their ample cornice that supported the public's gallery. This setup was complemented in 2010 by a painted ceiling by Cy Twombly that pays homage to great artists of ancient Greece. In 2020-2021, the room was redecorated by government architect Michel Goutal in the spirit of Lefuel's design of the 1860s, which triggered a lawsuit from the Cy Twombly Foundation, even though the painting was left untouched; the Louvre and the Cy Twombly Foundation eventually found an agreement to modify the redecoration to bring it closer to the earlier color combination.

To the south of the Upper Great Hall were two rooms leading to the Pavillon du Roi, a wardrobe and an antechamber, which were merged into a single King's antechamber (French: antichambre du Roi) in 1660, where Louis XIV used to dine in public. That room still displays its ornate carved ceiling, the central section of which was originally the ceiling of the 16th-century antechamber and was complemented by two side sections in the same style during the 1660 enlargement. The ceiling reserves three spaces for paintings, which were decorated in 1822 with works by Merry-Joseph Blondel. These were in turn deposed in 1938 and replaced in 1953 with Les Oiseaux, a set of paintings by Georges Braque that marked the first installation of contemporary art in the Louvre for more than half a century.

=== Second floor ===
The attic served as lodgings for high-ranking officials and courtiers until its suppression in the early 19th century. In the 1650s it was inhabited by Cardinal Mazarin's nieces. Since 1993 it has been dedicated to the exhibition of 19th-century French paintings.

=== Staircases ===
To the immediate north of these spaces is the Lescot Wing's ceremonial staircase, mostly preserved in its mid-16th-century state, known in the past as the grand degré du Roi and now as the escalier Henri II. Its vaulted stone ceiling is decorated with ornate motifs designed by Jean Goujon. Immediately to the north is the Pavillon de l'Horloge, built between 1624 and 1643 and served by that staircase and its symmetrical counterpart on the other side, known as escalier Henri IV (which is anachronistic, since it was only started in 1639 and left unfinished during the Fronde).

Two smaller spiral staircases also served the Lescot Wing and adjacent Pavillon du Roi. They still exist but are not open to the public.

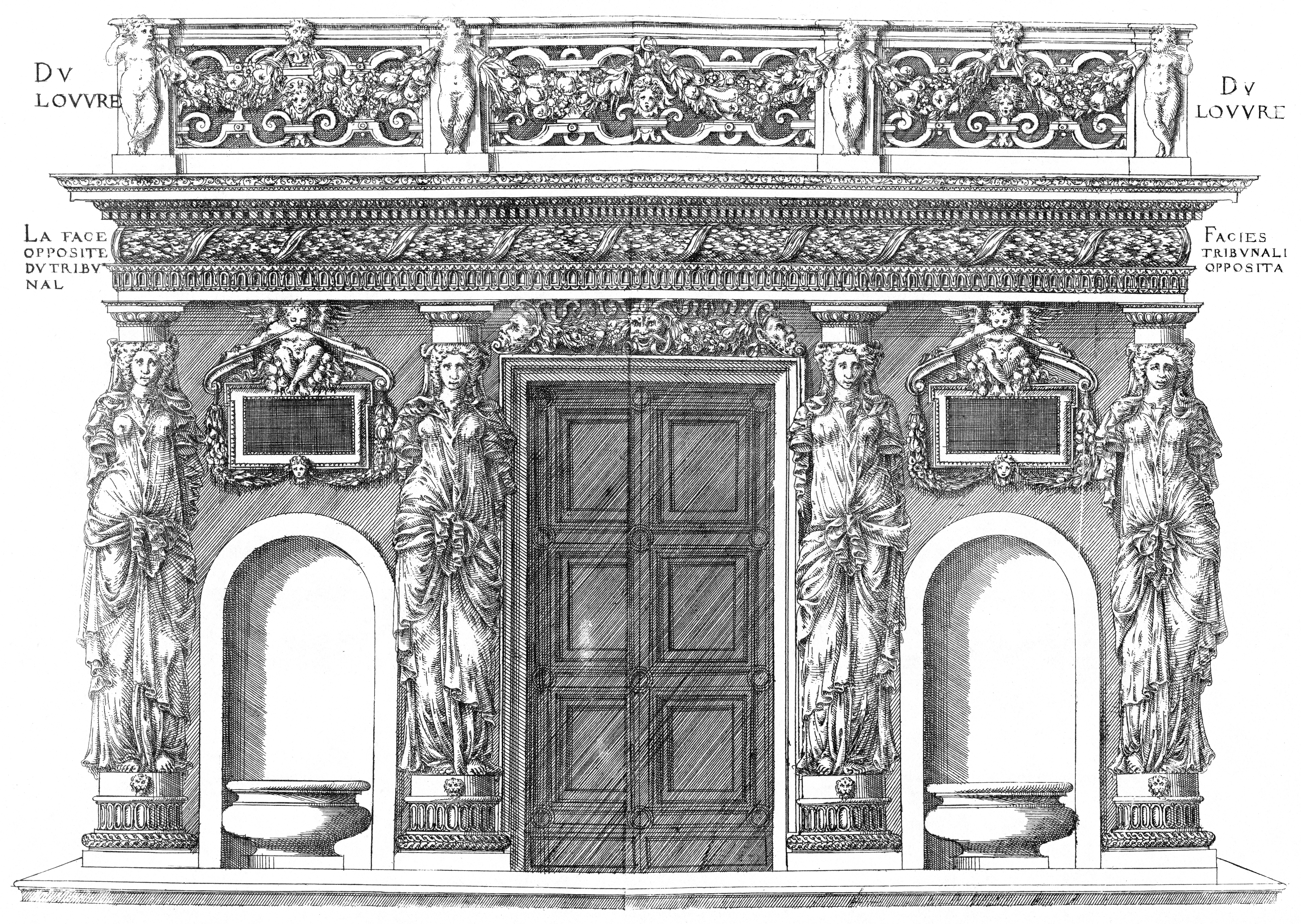
The Caryatids' Tribune in the Lower Great Hall, illustrated in Les Plus Excellents Bâtiments de France (1576) by Jacques I Androuet du Cerceau

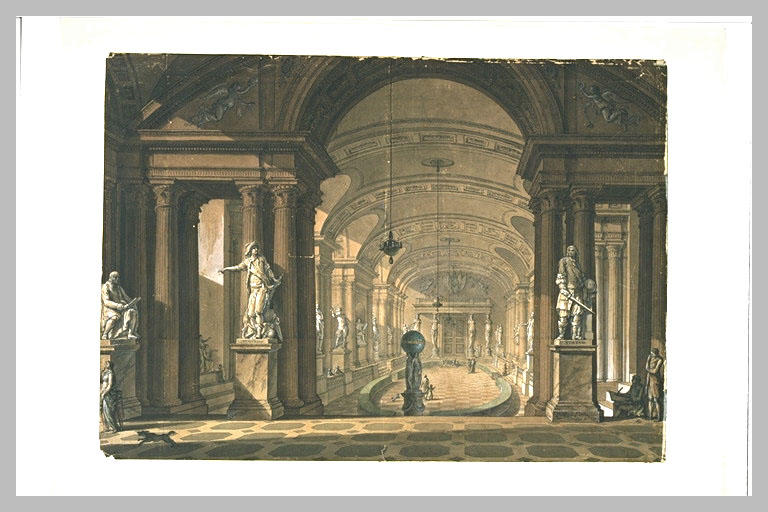
View of the Lower Great Hall across the "tribunal" in 1785, by Charles de Wailly, showing the statues commissioned by the Count of Angiviller

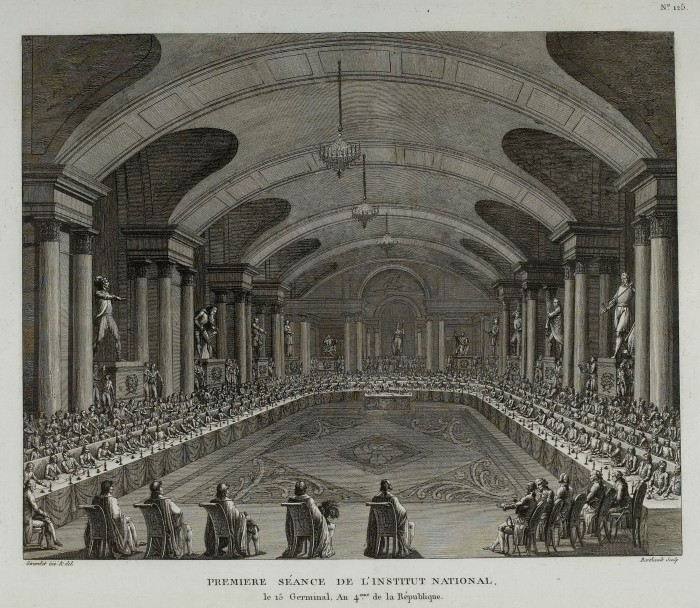
Inaugural session of the Institut de France in 1795, engraving by Abraham Girardet

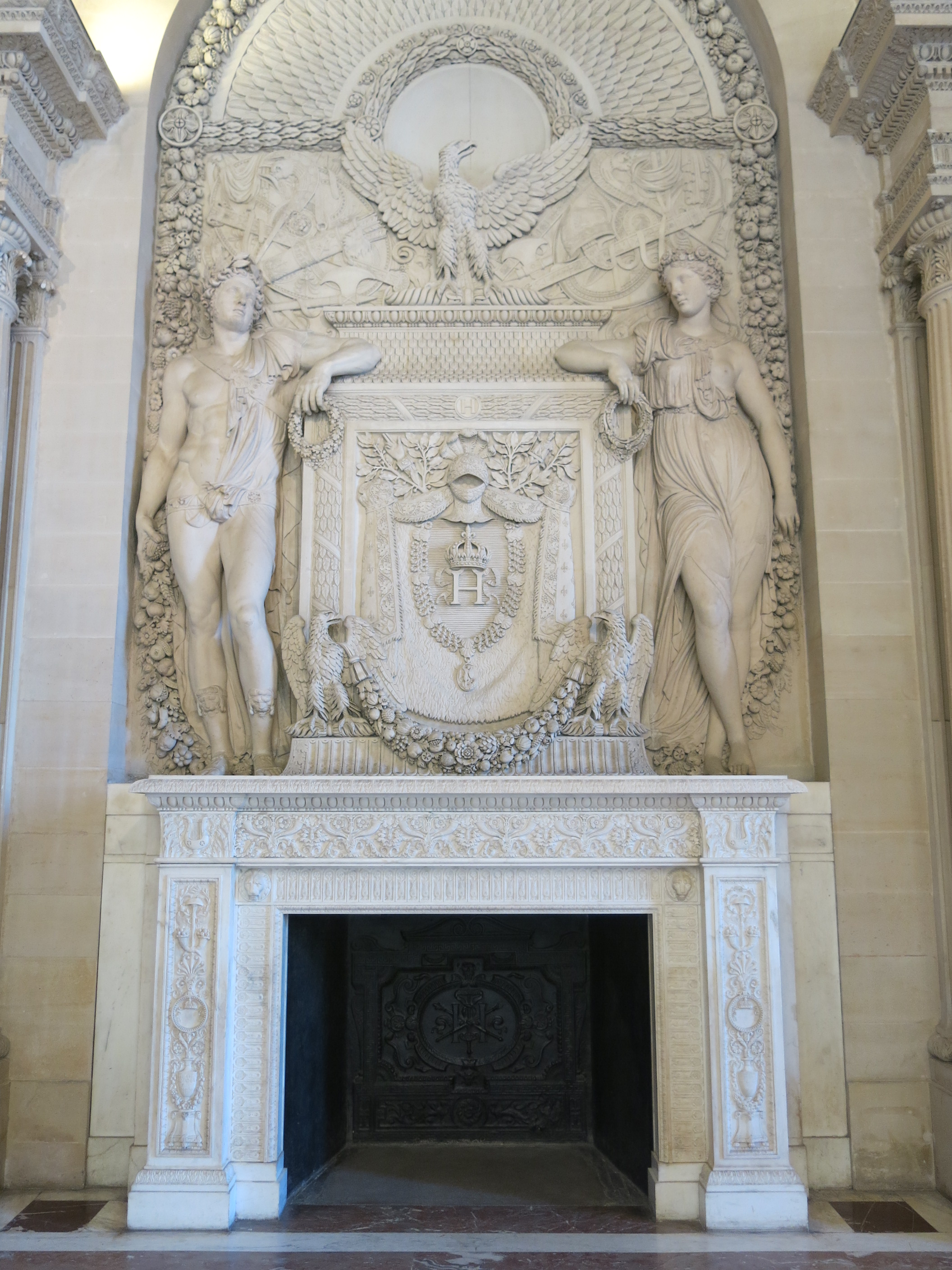
Fireplace of the "tribunal" created in the early 1800s, reusing sculpted elements from Goujon's time

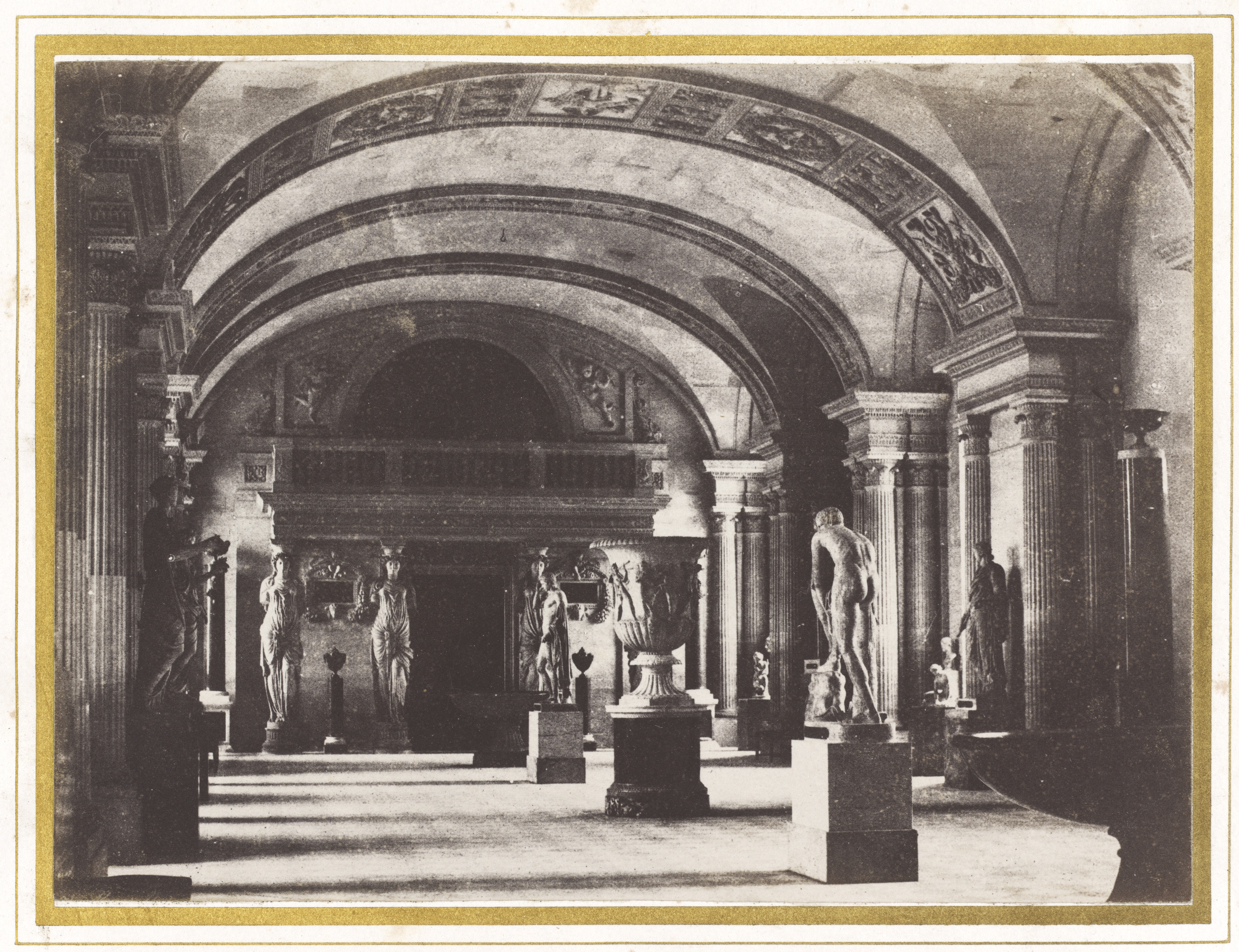
Early photograph of the Lower Great Hall, ca. 1851, by Charles Marville

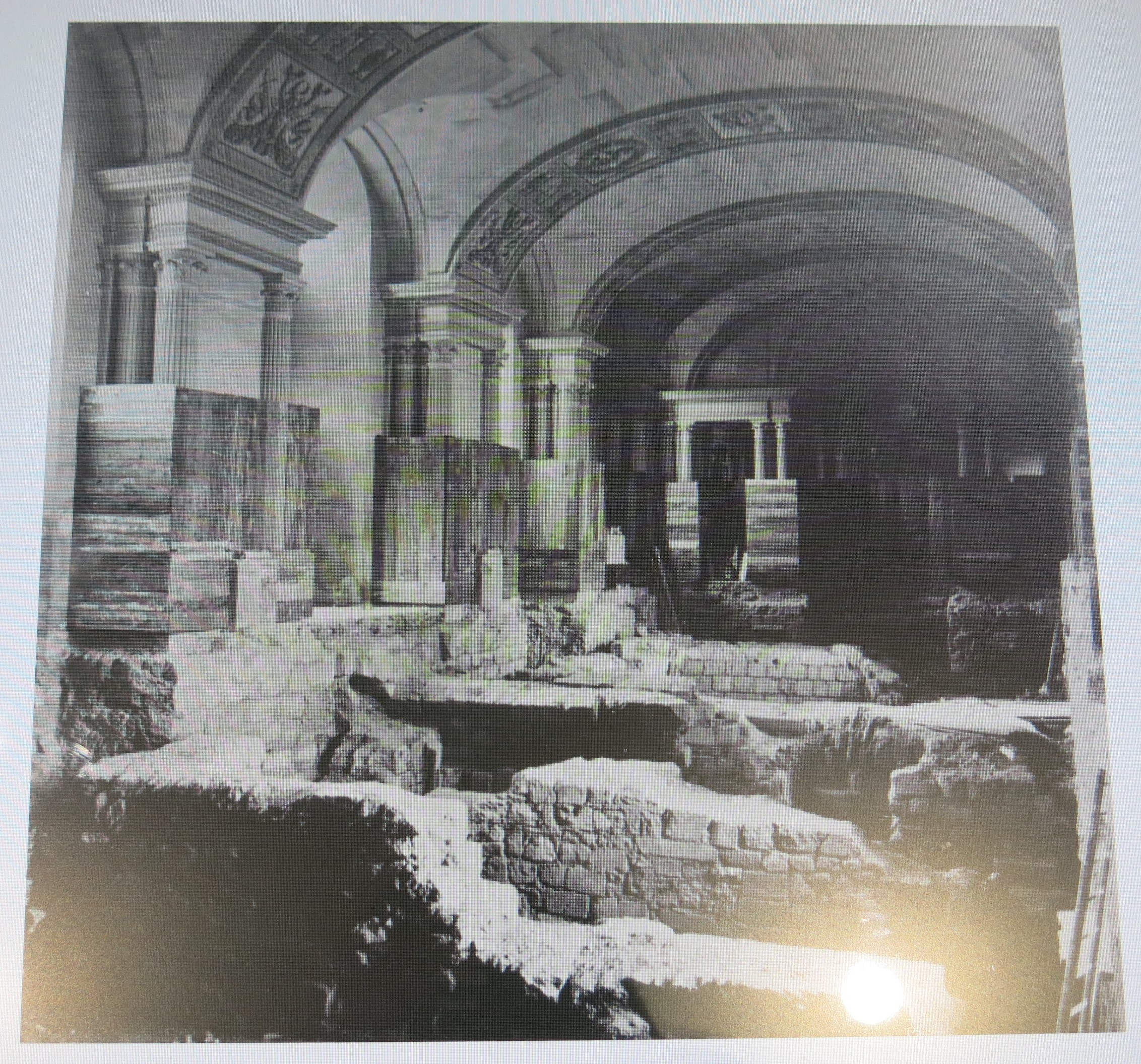
Excavation of the Medieval Louvre (initiated to install heating) under the Lower Great Hall, 1882

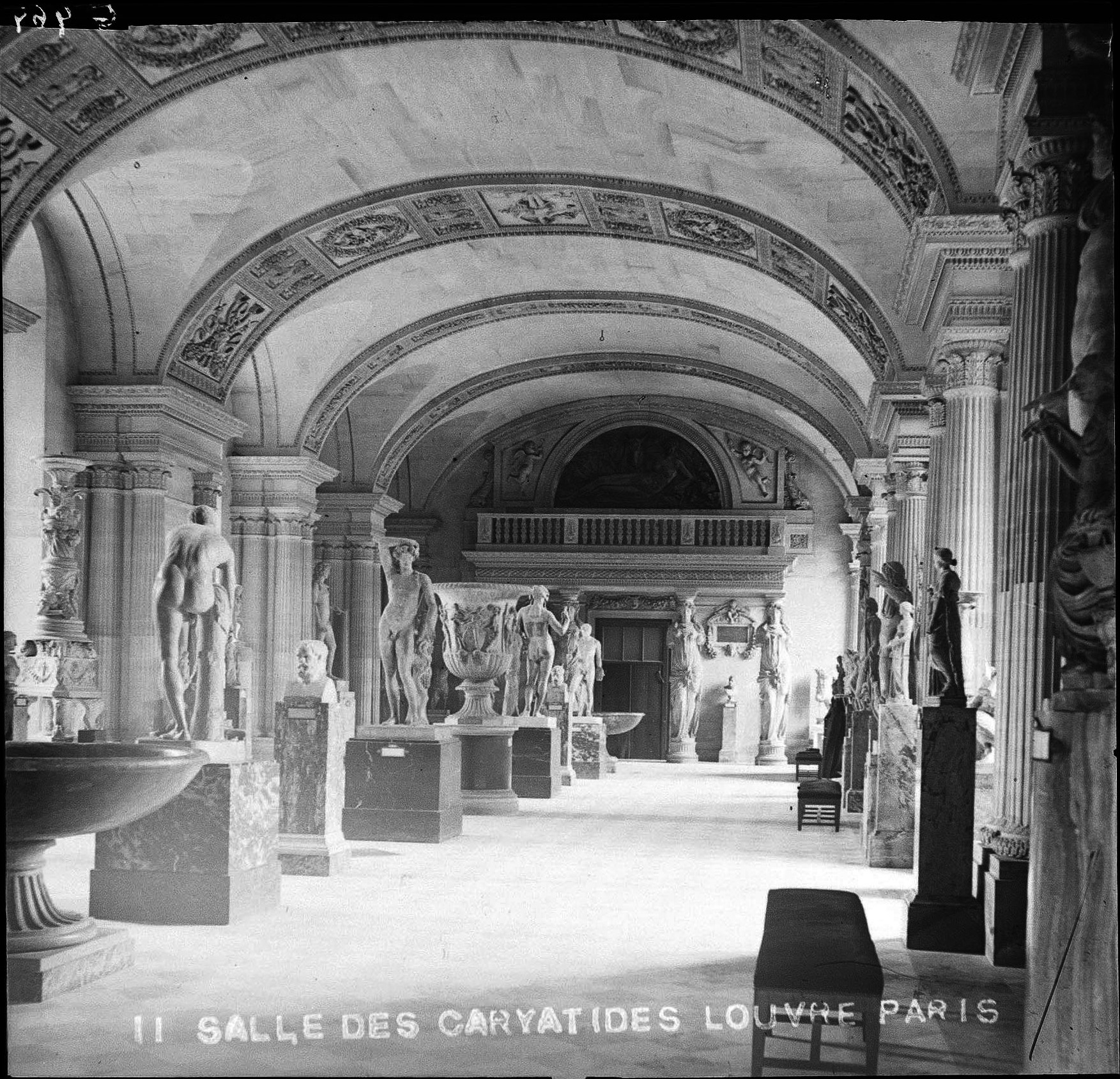
Lower Great Hall in the early 20C

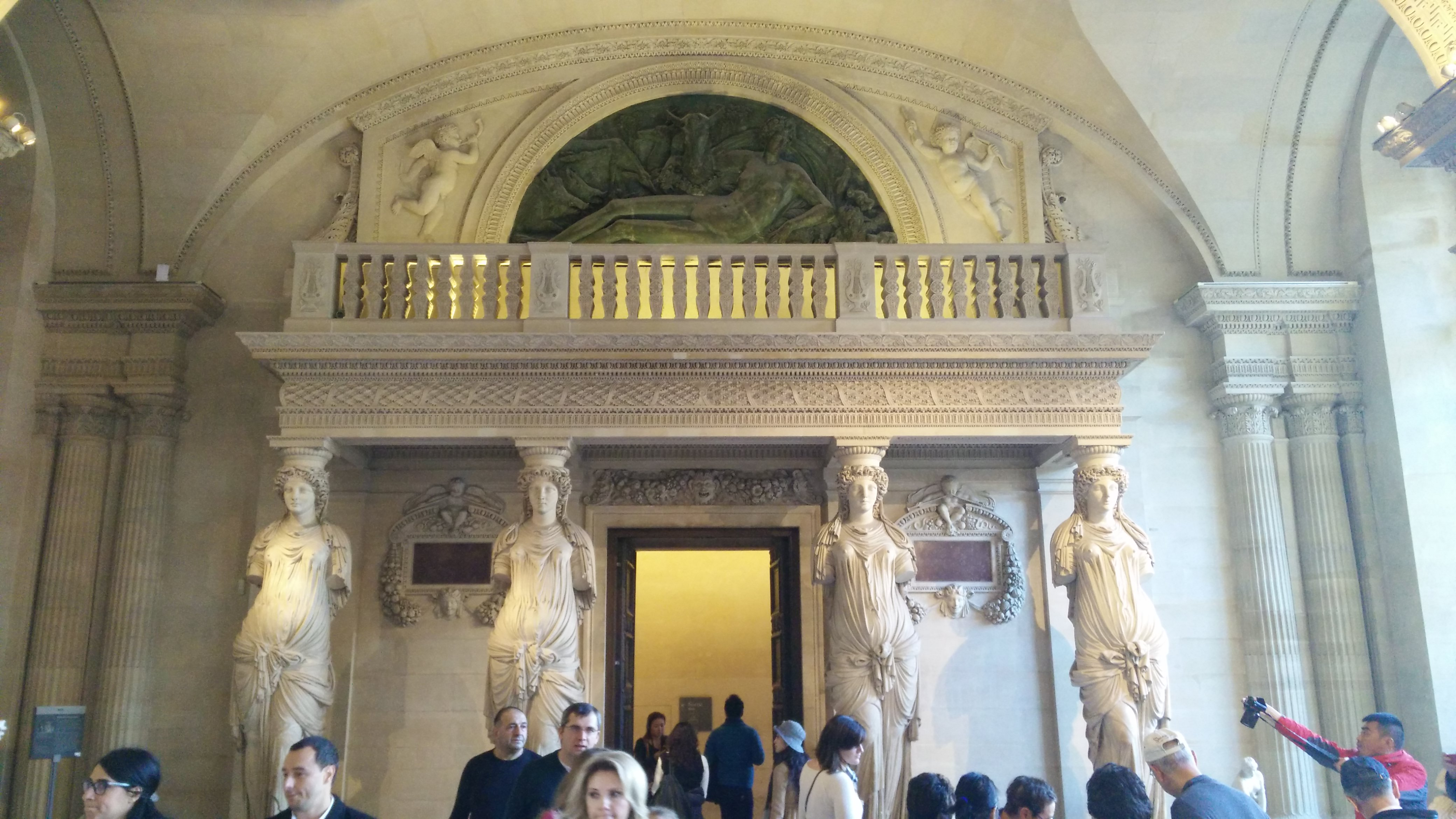
The Lower Great Hall's caryatids in 2014

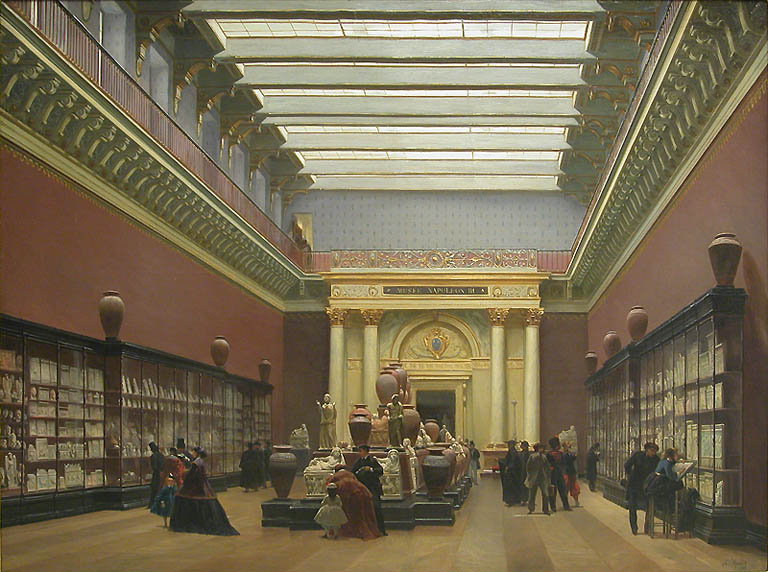
The Upper Great Hall in 1866, shortly after Lefuel's transformation

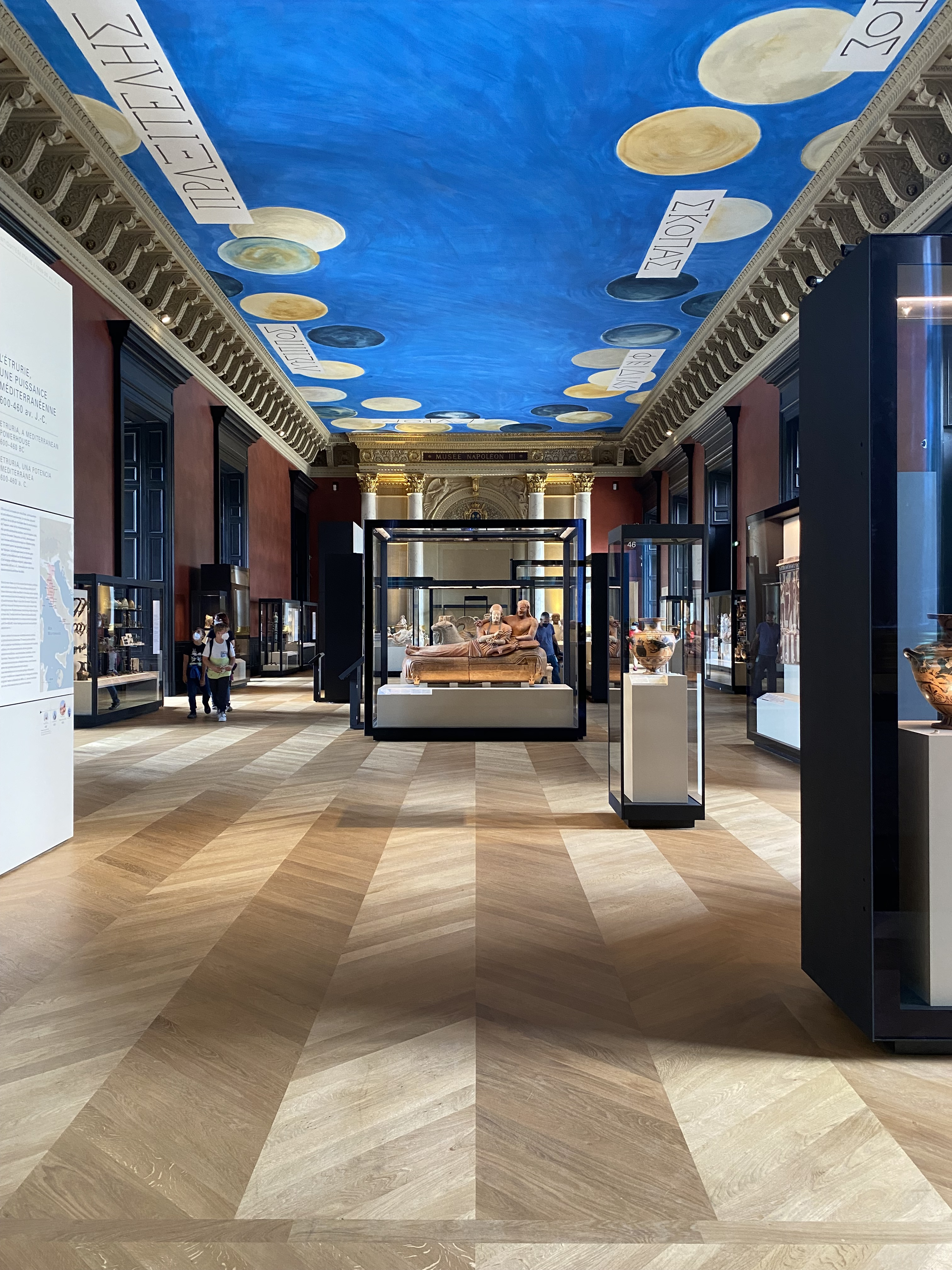
Upper Great Hall following redecoration in 2021

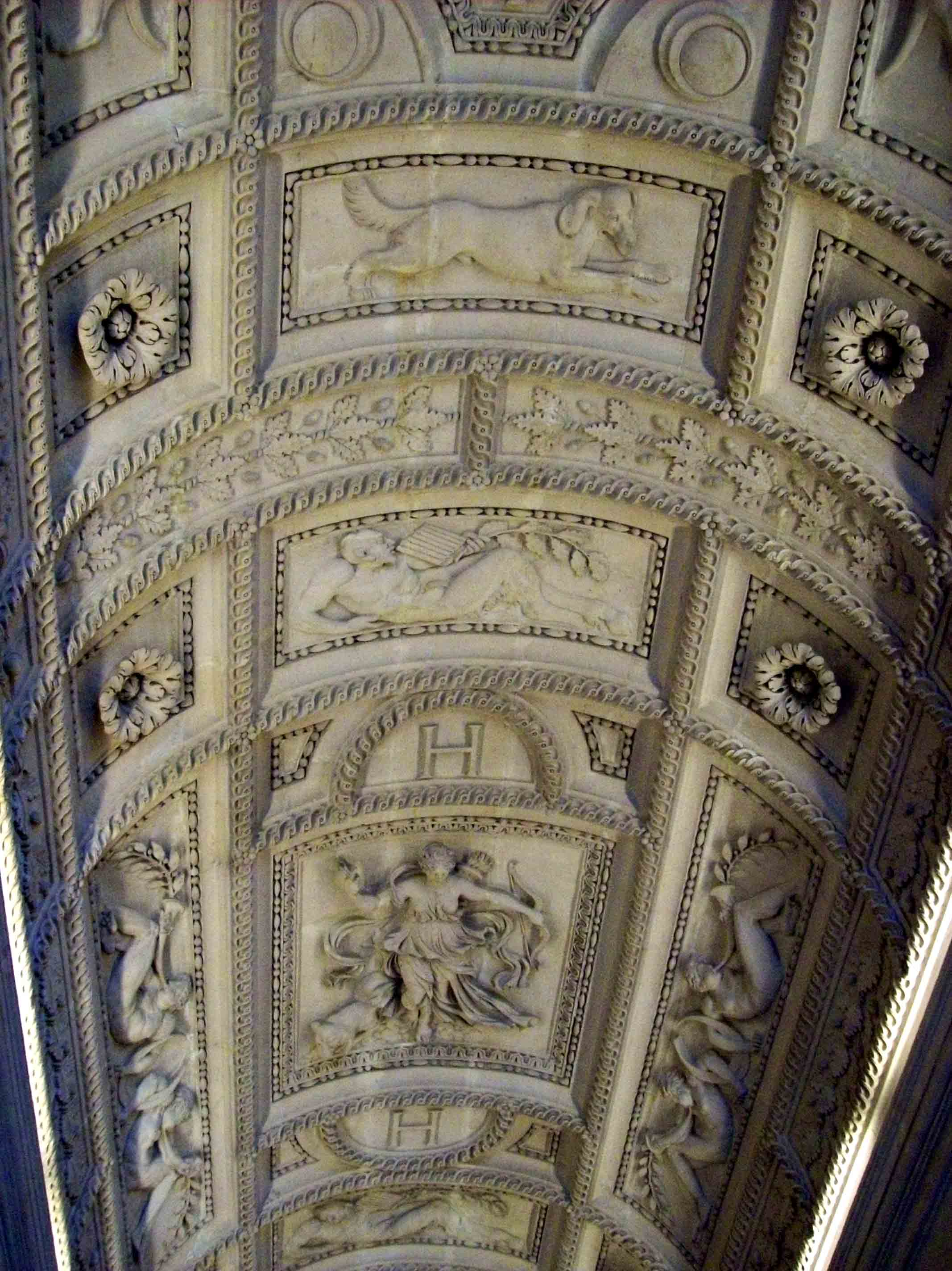
Ceiling of the ceremonial staircase

== See also ==
- Pavillon du Roi
- Cour Carrée
