= Pavillon de l'Horloge =

Pavilion in the Palais du Louvre

Coordinates: 48°51′38.21″N 2°20′15.70″E

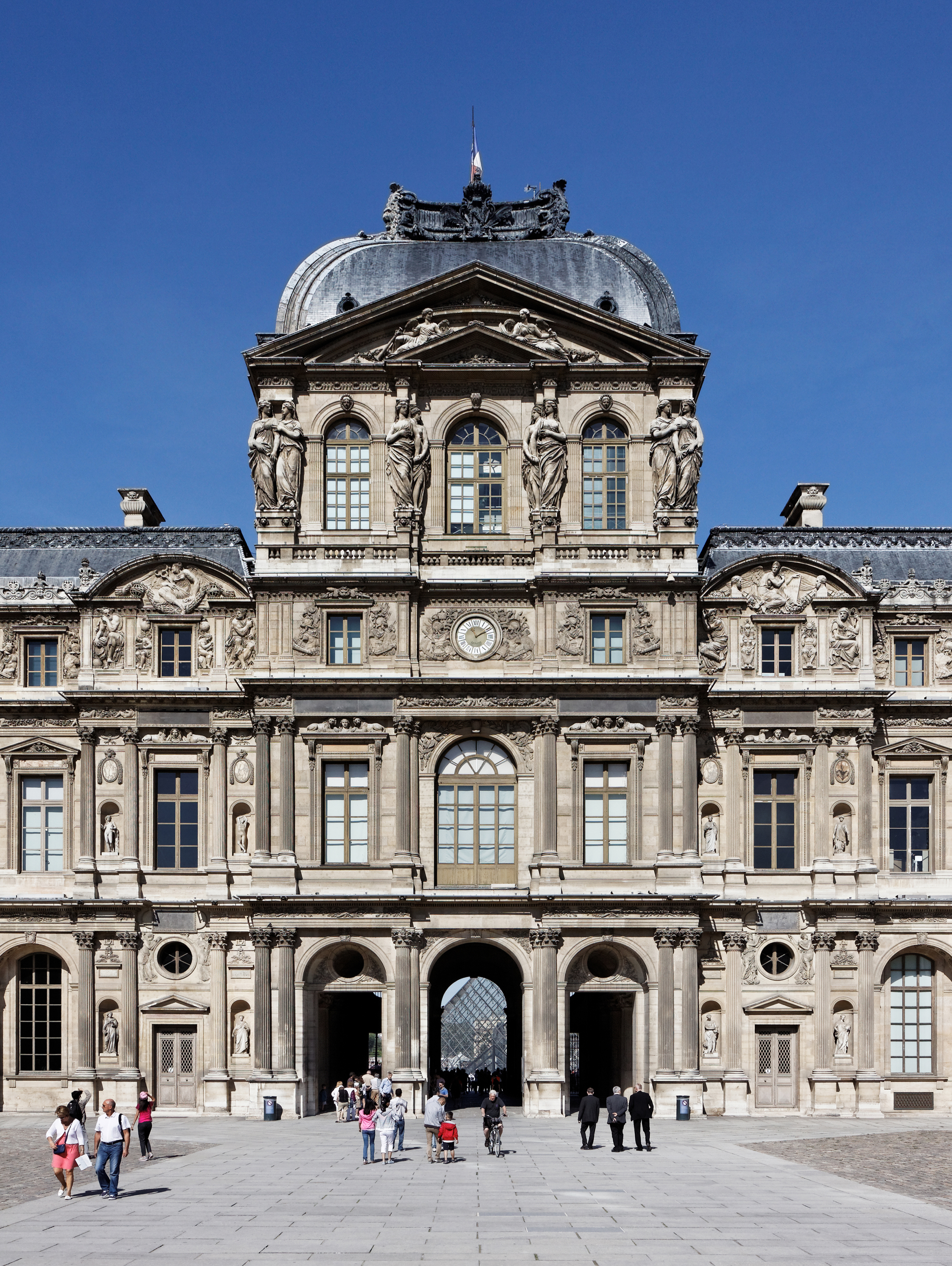
Eastern façade of the Pavillon de l'Horloge on the Louvre's Cour Carrée

The Pavillon de l'Horloge (French pronunciation: [pavijɔ̃ d(ə) lɔʁlɔʒ]; Clock Pavilion), also known as the Pavillon Sully ([pavijɔ̃ syli]), is a prominent architectural structure located in the center of the western wing of the Cour Carrée of the Louvre Palace in Paris. Since the late 19th century, the name Pavillon de l'Horloge has generally been applied to the structure's eastern face, which dates from the 17th century, and the name Pavillon Sully to its western face, which was redecorated in the 1850s as part of Napoleon III's Louvre expansion.

== History ==
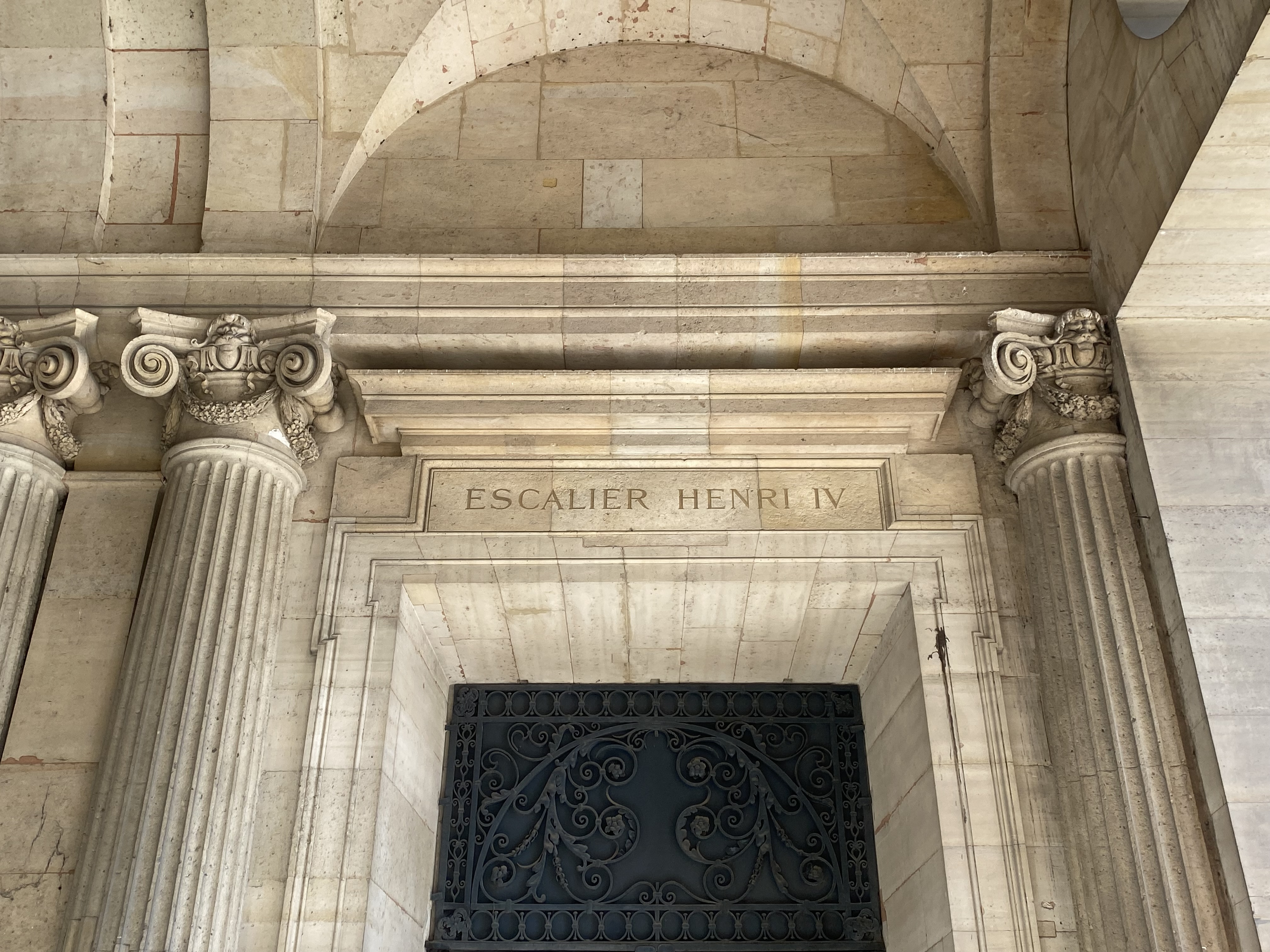
Entrance to the staircase from under the Pavilion, anachronistically labeled "Escalier Henri IV" even though it was built a generation after the death of King Henry IV

The pavilion was built just north of the older Lescot Wing between 1624 and about 1645, a protracted process because of the difficulties faced by France in the late 1620s and 1630s. The structure and its iconic square-domed roof were designed by architect Jacques Lemercier, who was selected in a competition in 1624.

On 1 September 1794, a semaphore or télégraphe of the type recently invented by Claude Chappe was installed at the top of the Pavilion. It remained there until 1806, when it was removed for aesthetic and safety reasons by the Louvre's architect Pierre-François-Léonard Fontaine.

In the early 19th century, a clock (French: horloge) was placed on the attic level, giving the pavilion its current name.

The western façade was comprehensively remodeled by Hector-Martin Lefuel in the 1850s during the Second Empire. that is when the name of Pavillon Sully (after Maximilien de Béthune, Duke of Sully) was given to it. Lefuel also rebuilt the structure's two iconic chimneys, which had been demolished in the early 19th century.

== Interior ==
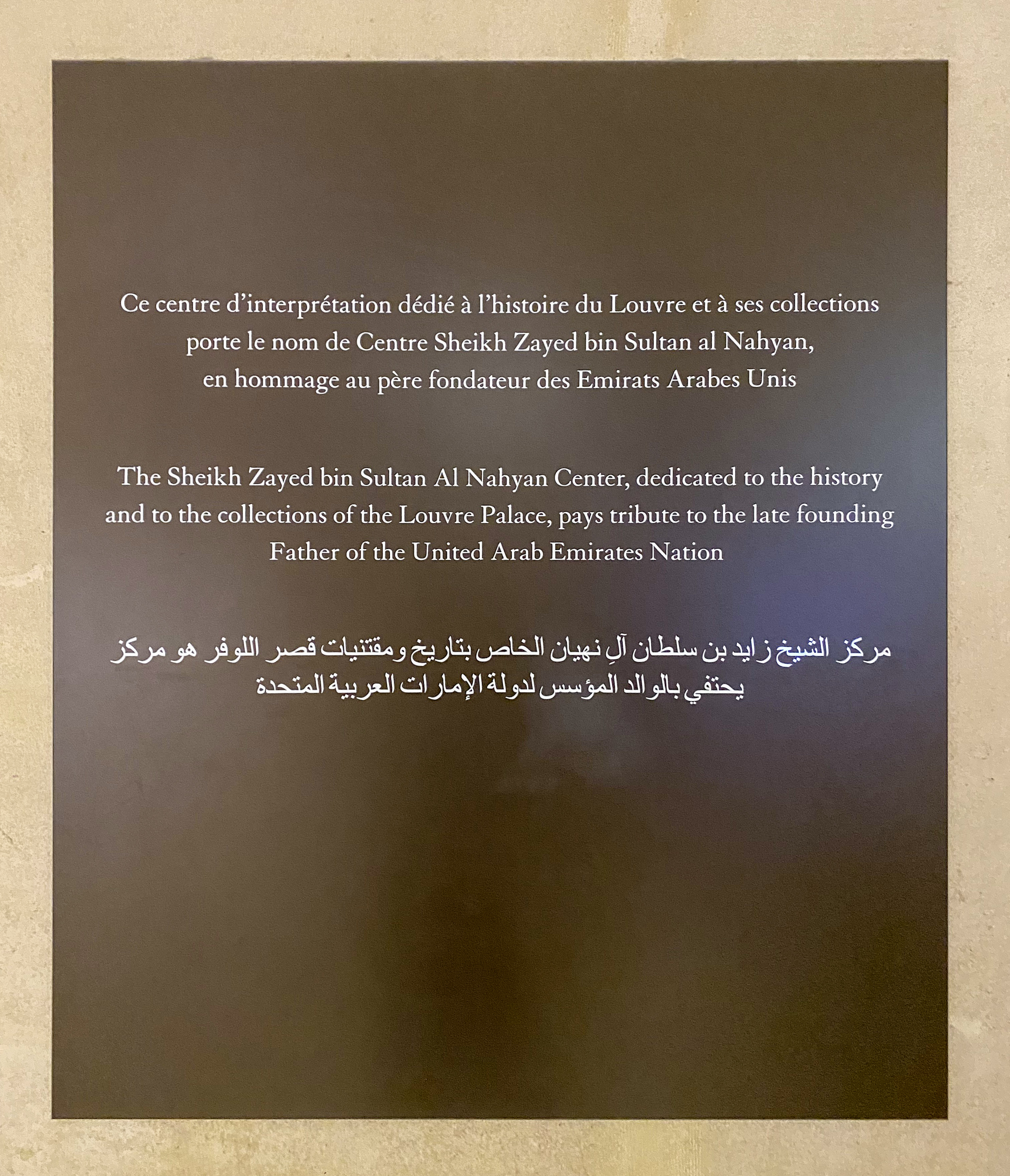
Plaque memorializing the naming of the pavilion's underground space in honor of Zayed bin Sultan Al Nahyan, unveiled on 5 July 2016 by French President François Hollande and UAE Foreign Minister Abdullah bin Zayed Al Nahyan

The underground level or Crypte Sully was first designed in the 1930s by Louvre architect Albert Ferran as part of a broader plan to create a seamless museum itinerary on the ground level of the Cour Carrée. It was remade in the 1980s as part of the Grand Louvre project, under which it also connects the underground spaces beneath the Louvre Pyramid with the newly established rooms preserving the remains of the Medieval Louvre.

On the first floor above the passageway are a corridor linking the two monumental staircases that flank the Pavilion and, facing the Cour Napoléon, a large room that was fitted in the 1650s to be the Louvre Palace Chapel. This room, the Salle de la Chapelle, used to be of double height but was vertically partitioned in the 18th century to create space in the attic. A 1915 project to restore the double height was left unimplemented. The room was used for exhibition of ancient bronze objects, then for temporary exhibitions from the 1990s to the 2010s, and since July 2016 has been dedicated to the history of the Louvre's collections. On its entrance door is a wrought iron gate originally from the Château de Maisons, installed there in 1819 by architect Pierre Fontaine.

On the second floor or attic, the main room above the former chapel has been devoted since 2016 to information about new developments at the Louvre and its two satellites in Lens, Northern France and Abu Dhabi, UAE.

The third floor used to be a single large room extending all the way to the roof. From its completion in 1644 it was used to store furniture. In the 1850s, Hector-Martin Lefuel created a skylight to bring light from the ceiling. This room was remodeled by Louvre architect Victor-Auguste Blavette around 1920, and the Louvre's pioneering collection of Islamic art was displayed there from June 1922. It was then known as Salle Delort de Gléon, as a tribute to businessman Alphonse Delort de Gléon (1843–1899) and his wife Marie–Augustine (1852–1911), who bequeathed Islamic art pieces that joined the Louvre's collection in 1912. This room, however, was partitioned in 1979 to create reserve space for the Louvre's paintings collection, and further partitioned in the 2000s so that it now has four levels inside.

The timber work supporting the roof is largely original from the 17th century.

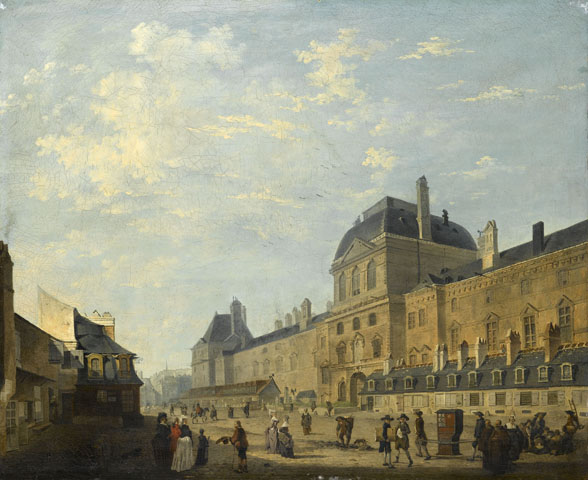
Lemercier's western façade from the former rue Fromenteau, late 18th century

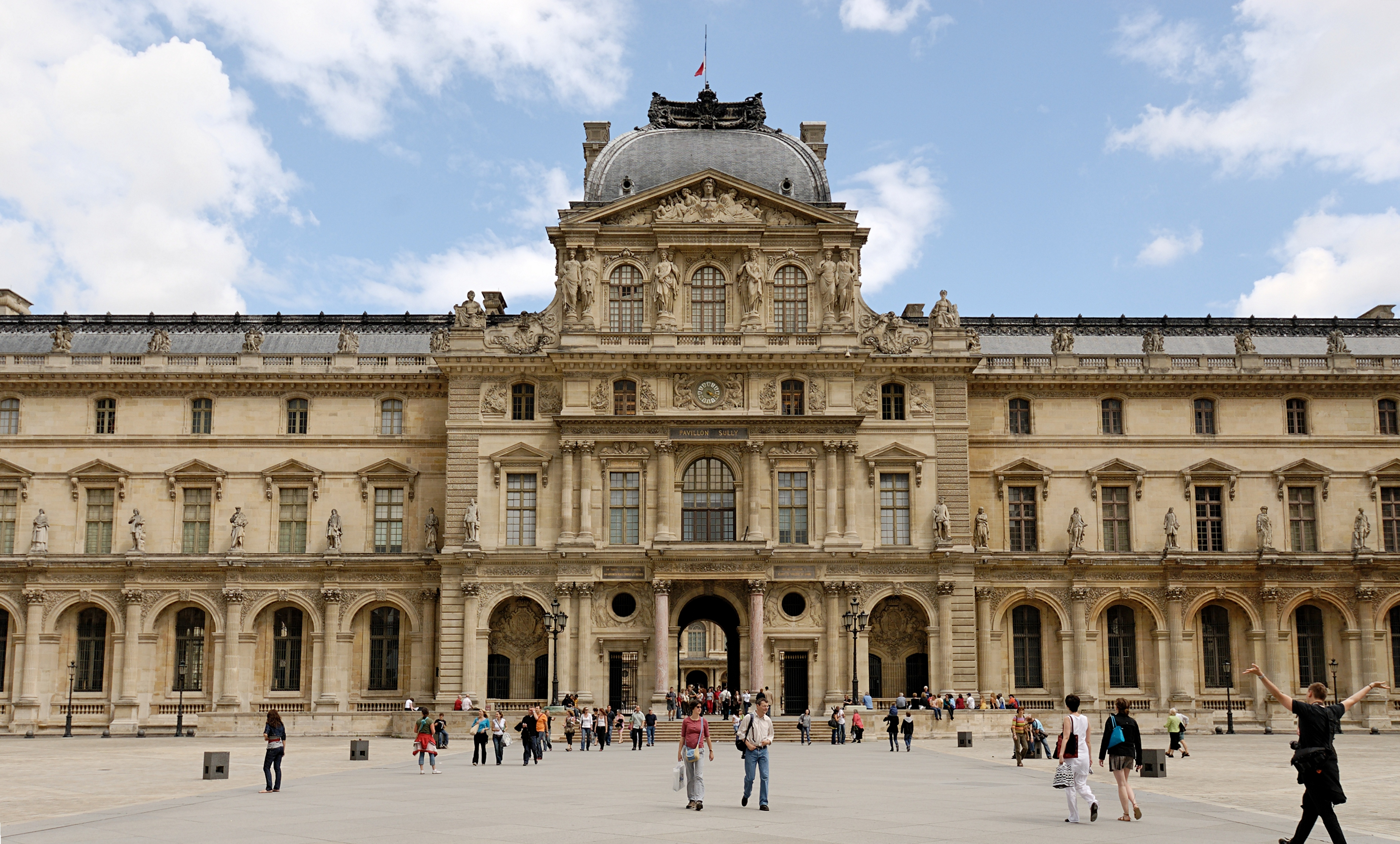
Western façade of the Pavillon Sully, redesigned by Hector Lefuel

Covered passageway or guichet of the Pavillon Sully

== See also ==
- Pavillon du Roi
