= Minstrels' gallery =

Balcony used by performing musicians

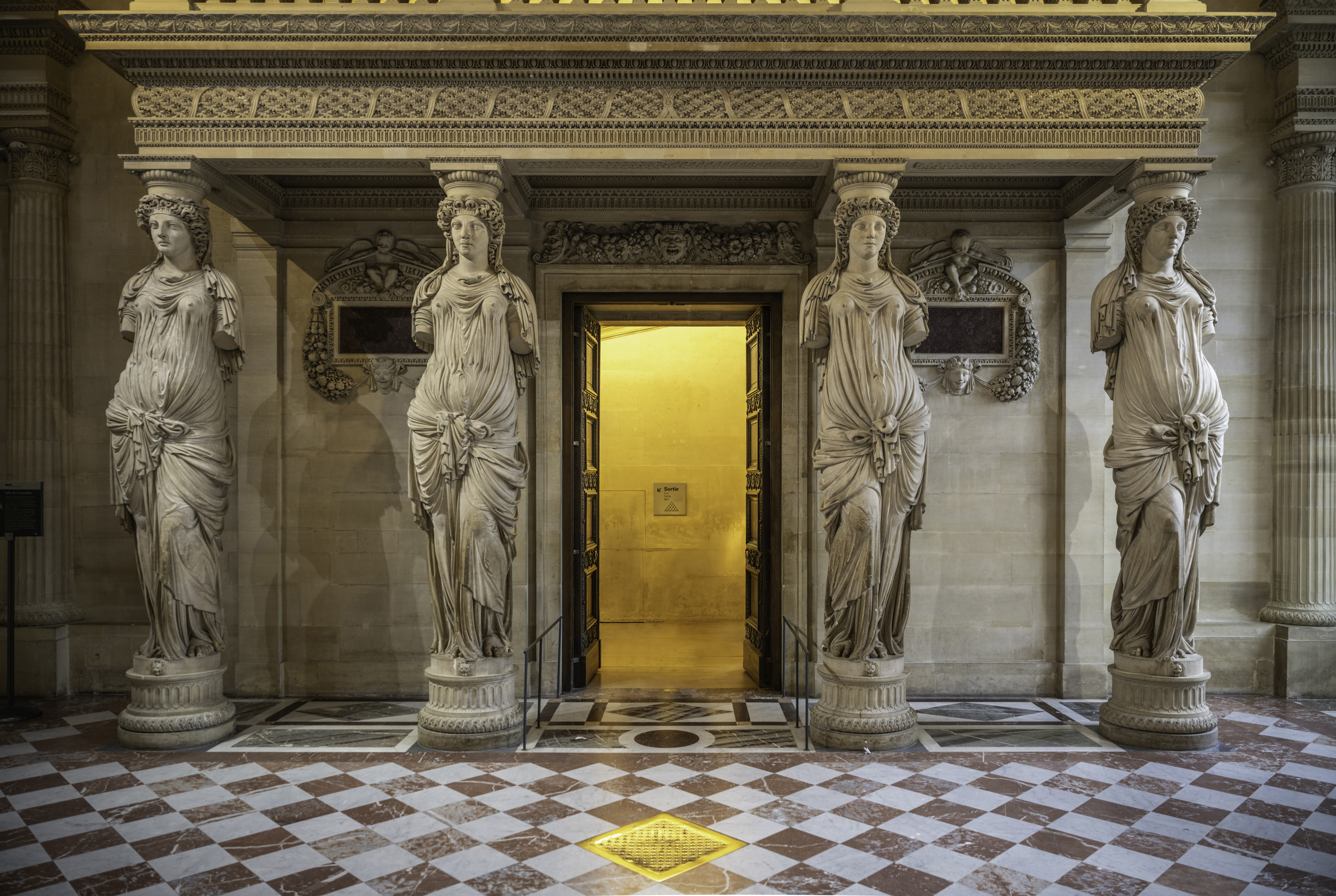
The elaborate minstrels' gallery in the Lescot Wing's lower main room, Louvre Palace, Paris

A minstrels' gallery is a form of balcony, often inside the great hall of a castle or manor house, and used to allow musicians (originally minstrels) to perform, sometimes discreetly hidden from the guests below.

== Notable examples ==
- A rare example of a minstrels' gallery in a sacred setting can be found in Exeter Cathedral. It is not clear why the term "musicians' gallery" has not been used here instead, as minstrels were always secular performers and would therefore have been forbidden from performing in a liturgical context.
- A fine example of a minstrels' gallery can also be seen in the Great Hall of Durham Castle, University College, Durham, which was once used for entertainment by the Prince Bishops and is now occasionally used during College Feasts.
- A restored oak minstrels' gallery is visible in Desmond Hall and Castle, Ireland (15th century).
- Constructed in the 14th century, the Great Hall of Berkeley Castle in Gloucestershire, England, features a towering timber hammerbeam roof, a minstrel's gallery, and a series of tapestries. Folklore states that Dickie Pearce, the last official court jester in England, died after falling from the gallery in 1728.
