= Synagogue Charles Liché =

Synagogue in Paris, France

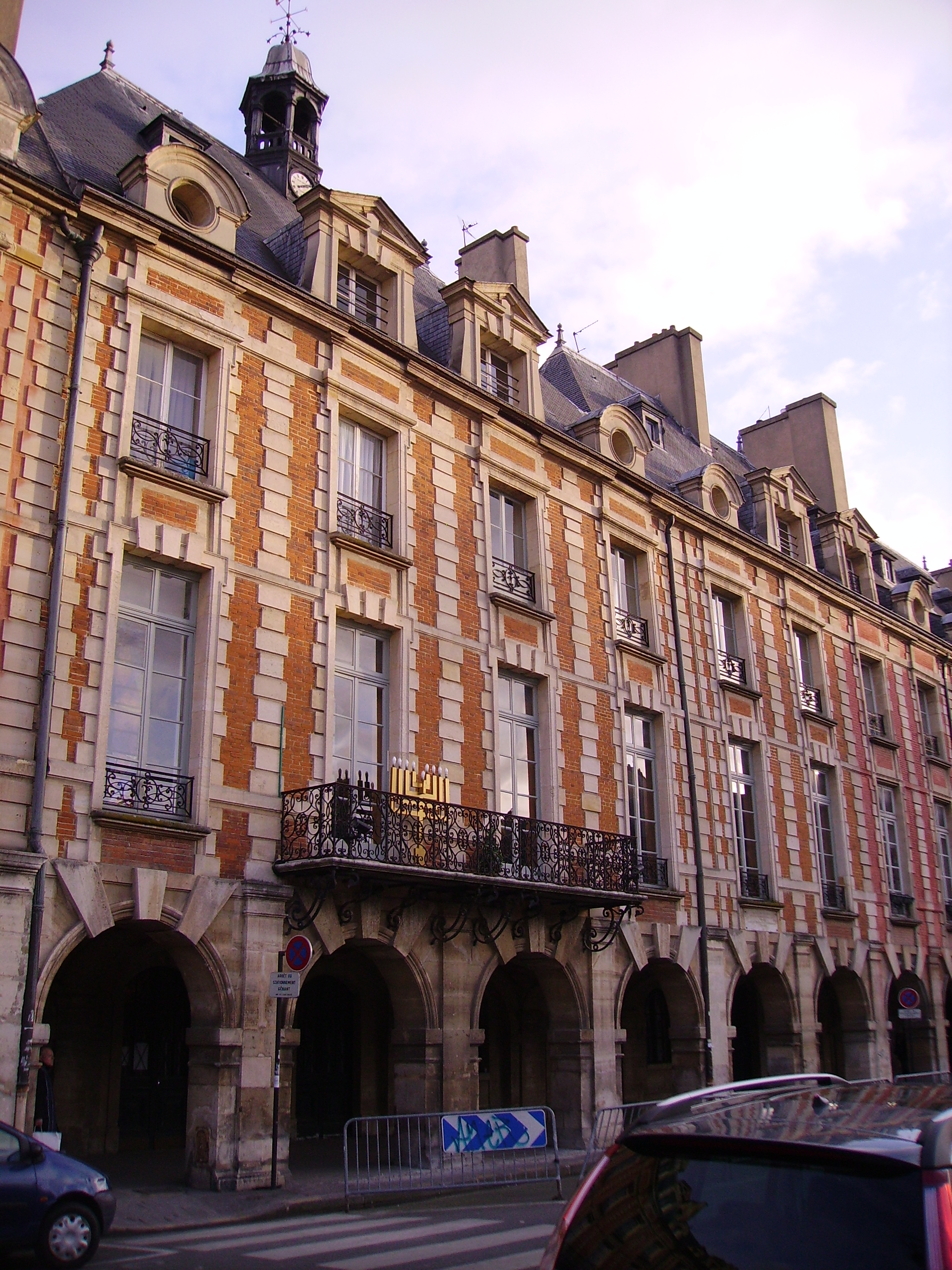

Religion
- Affiliation: Judaism
- Province: Paris
- Region: Ile de France

Location
- Interactive map of Synagogue Charles Liché
- Coordinates: 48.855405°N 2.366464°E

The synagogue Charles-Liché is located at 14 Place des Vosges in the 4th arrondissement of Paris in the Hôtel de Ribault, on the 1st floor.

== History ==
The synagogue was founded in 1963 by Ashkenazi Jews; it has protected architecture from the 20th century.

After the death of rabbi Charles Liché, Olivier Kaufmann was named rabbi of the synagogue.
