= Atara Marmor =

French historian and art collector (1943–2003)

Atara Marmor (Betty-Anne-Atara Marmor, née Feuerwerker; Clairvivre (Salagnac), Dordogne, France, September 3, 1943 – Bet Shemesh, Israel, September 21, 2003) was a French historian and art collector.

== Biography ==
Atara Marmor was born in Clairvivre (Salagnac), Dordogne, during World War II. She was the daughter of rabbi David Feuerwerker and of Antoinette Feuerwerker. She was the eldest of 6 children, of whom the other five were born in the 16th arrondissement of Paris. At the time of her birth, her father was officially the rabbi of Brive-la-Gaillarde and three neighbouring Departments.

Her father, warned in 1943 of his imminent arrest by the Gestapo, through the network of the French Resistance, found refuge in Switzerland, his native country, for the duration of the last six months of the war. Her mother, stayed with her in France. She had beforehand found a potential refuge, for her and her baby. When the day came to hide, she went to those who had offered her help, but she was told: «It is too dangerous!». Without another alternative, Antoinette Feuerwerker found a haven in a Catholic convent. The mother and her daughter shared a cell and survived on potatoes and water.

At the Libération of France, rabbi David Feuerwerker became the Chief Rabbi of Lyon, and, with his wife, he worked at the reconstruction of French Jewry. Atara lived in Lyon from 1944 to 1946, with her parents, at quai Tilsit.

In 1946, rabbi David Feuerwerker was elected rabbi of Neuilly-sur-Seine. They then lived 12, Rue Ancelle. Atara would be involved in the epic of the SS Exodus. The money intended for this illegal transport was entrusted to Antoinette Feuerwerker. It was in gold ingots, which at the time, individuals did not possess the right to own. Antoinette Feuerwerker sought a place to hide them, before she could return them. She chose to place them, without her husband's knowledge, under his bed. Her reasoning was that no one will suspect him. One day, Atara played on the ground, and caught sight of the treasure under the bed. Her mother told her, «These are golden buttons», so that in case the child talked, the news would not spread.

In 1948, rabbi David Feuerwerker became the rabbi of the second largest Synagogue of Paris, the Synagogue de la rue des Tournelles and the family then lived at 14, place des Vosges, in the heart of Marais, until 1966. Atara went to high school in Paris, notably at the Lycée Victor-Duruy and at the Lycée Fénelon.

In her late teens, she made a long stay in the United States, where she learned American English. She spent one year in Mansfield (Ohio), living with Rabbi Harstein and his family. She got used to the American way of life. She completed her High School diploma in Mansfield. She then moved to New York. The wife of the Rebbe of Lubavitch, Menachem Mendel Schneerson, the Rebbetzin Chaya Mushka Schneerson, showed her the American metropolis.

She studied in New York at the Stern College for Women of Yeshiva University.

When the doyen of French poets, André Spire died in 1966, rabbi David Feuerwerker led his funeral service. André Spire's family requested an intimate funeral in his little village outside of Paris, and requested the presence of Atara, the friend of the Spires' only child, Marie-Brunette, and she attended.

When her family settled in Montreal, Quebec, Atara studied sociology at the Université de Montréal. She then completed her Master's thesis in History in 1976 on L'Histoire des mentalités: le concours de l'Académie de Metz dans les trois évêchés en 1785-1787-1788.

She spent several years researching for her Ph.D. in Architectural History on the famous architect Ludwig Mies van der Rohe and the School of the Bauhaus.

Since an early age, she was interested in music (she had private classes in violin with Monsieur Abraham Bourlinski, who offered her a violin which then accompanied her throughout her life.).

She loved to paint. From her bedroom with a view on the famous Place des Vosges, she painted still lives of the former Place Royale.

Later, once married to Murray Marmor, a pharmacist in Montreal, an art buff, she became an expert in art and painting. The Marmors, collectors of masterpieces lent to museums certain of their masterpieces and made gifts of others.

Atara and Murray Marmor had two children.

While visiting her daughter in Ramat Bet Shemesh (Israel), at the age of 60, suddenly on the eve of the Jewish Festival of Sukkot, on September 21, 2003, she died and was buried in Bet Shemesh. She had just decided with her husband to make Aliyah to Israel.

== See also ==
- Antoinette Feuerwerker
- David Feuerwerker

== Bibliography ==
- The Rebbetzin Chaya Mushka Schneersohn. A Brief Biography. Merkos L'Inyonei Chinuch: New York, 1999, 2004. ISBN 0-8266-0101-4.
- Catherine Poujol. David Feuerwerker, Rabbin, Résistant, Enseignant, Historien. Archives Juives, Paris, 2002.
- Elie Feuerwerker. "Uris and 'Exodus' made an impact". The Jewish State (New Jersey), July 11, 2003/11 Tammuz 5763, p. 4.
- Elie Feuerwerker. "Potatoes". Letter to the Editor. The Jewish Press, New York, Friday, July 14, 2006, p. 5.
