= John S. Schuchman =

American educator and academic administrator

John Stanley Schuchman (November 12, 1938 – December 19, 2017) was an American educator and academic administrator who taught at Gallaudet University.

Born in Indianapolis on November 12, 1938, Schuchman was raised by parents Harry and Florence Schuchman, who were deaf and spoke American Sign Language at home. Schuchman graduated from Butler University in 1961 with a bachelor's degree, then earned a Master's degree in history in 1963 and doctorate in history in 1969 from Indiana University Bloomington, as well as a J. D. from Georgetown. He joined the Gallaudet University faculty in 1967. Three year later, Schuchman began his career as an academic administrator, first as dean of Gallaudet, then vice president for academic affairs, and provost. He stepped down in 1985, and resumed teaching. In 1988, Schuchman wrote Hollywood Speaks: Deafness and the Film Entertainment Industry, which covered the portrayal of deafness in the film industry. Schuchman retired in 1998, though he continued to teach until 2000. In 2002, Schuchman and Donna F. Ryan coauthored Deaf People in Hitler's Europe, about the persecution of the deaf in Nazi Germany though what later became known as Aktion T4. Schuchman died of cancer on December 19, 2017, at his home in Ashburn, Virginia, aged 79.
