= Pavillon du Roi =

Pavilion of the Louvre Palace

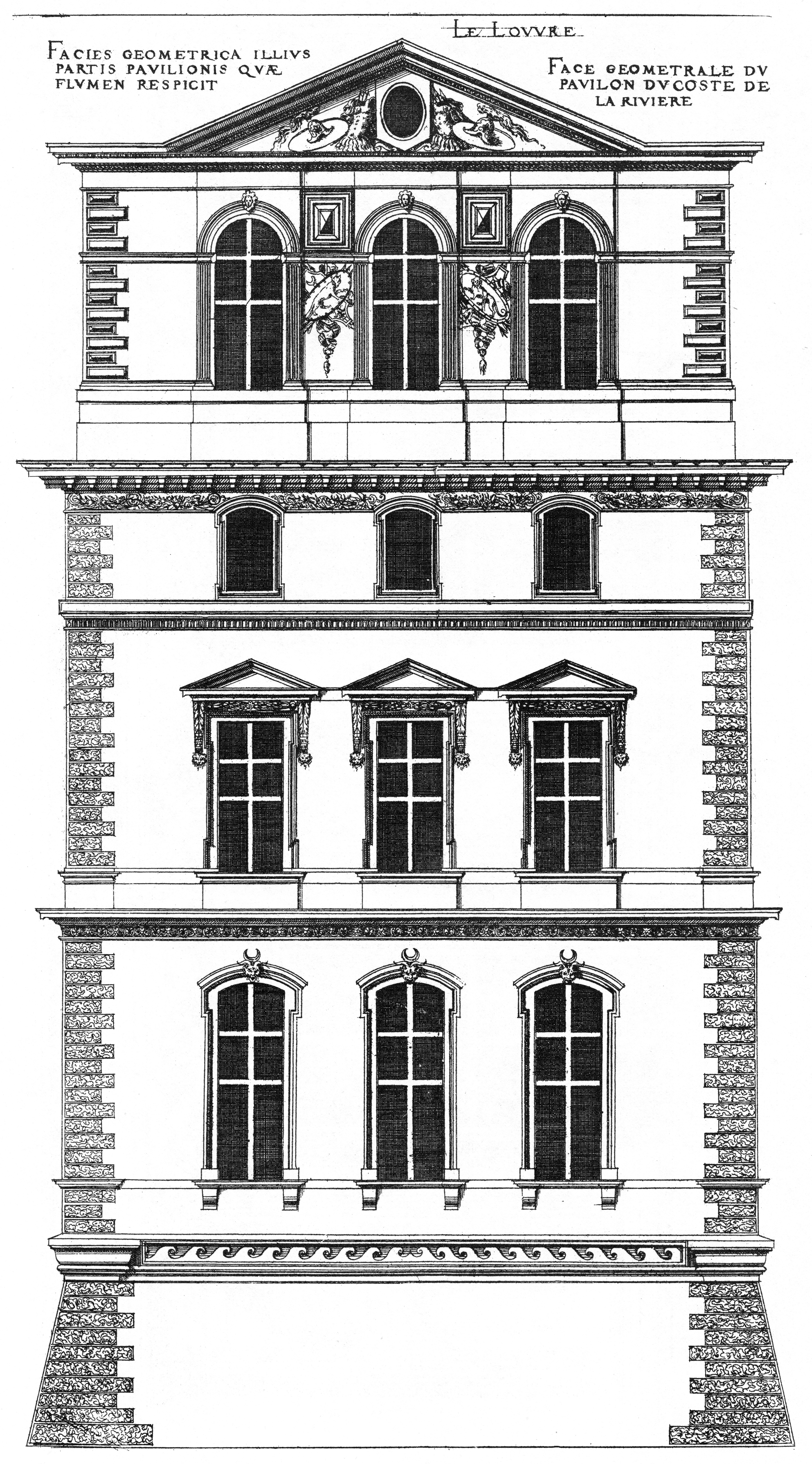
River façade of the Pavillon du Roi (1576), engraved by Jacques Androuet du Cerceau

The Pavillon du Roi (French pronunciation: [pavijɔ̃ dy ʁwa]; lit. 'Pavilion of the King') was a tower-like structure built in the mid-16th century at the southern end of the Lescot Wing of the Louvre Palace. On its main floor (piano nobile) was the primary apartment of the king of France. The pavilion served as a major emblem of the French monarchy for more than a century, and its design had seminal influence. From the 17th century, however, it gradually lost its visual and symbolic prominence. In the early 1640s, it was eclipsed by the slightly larger and more ornate Pavillon de l'Horloge; in the late 1660s, its main southern façade was hidden behind new structures; and in the early 19th century, its upper level was demolished and its interior arrangements were entirely remodeled.

== History ==
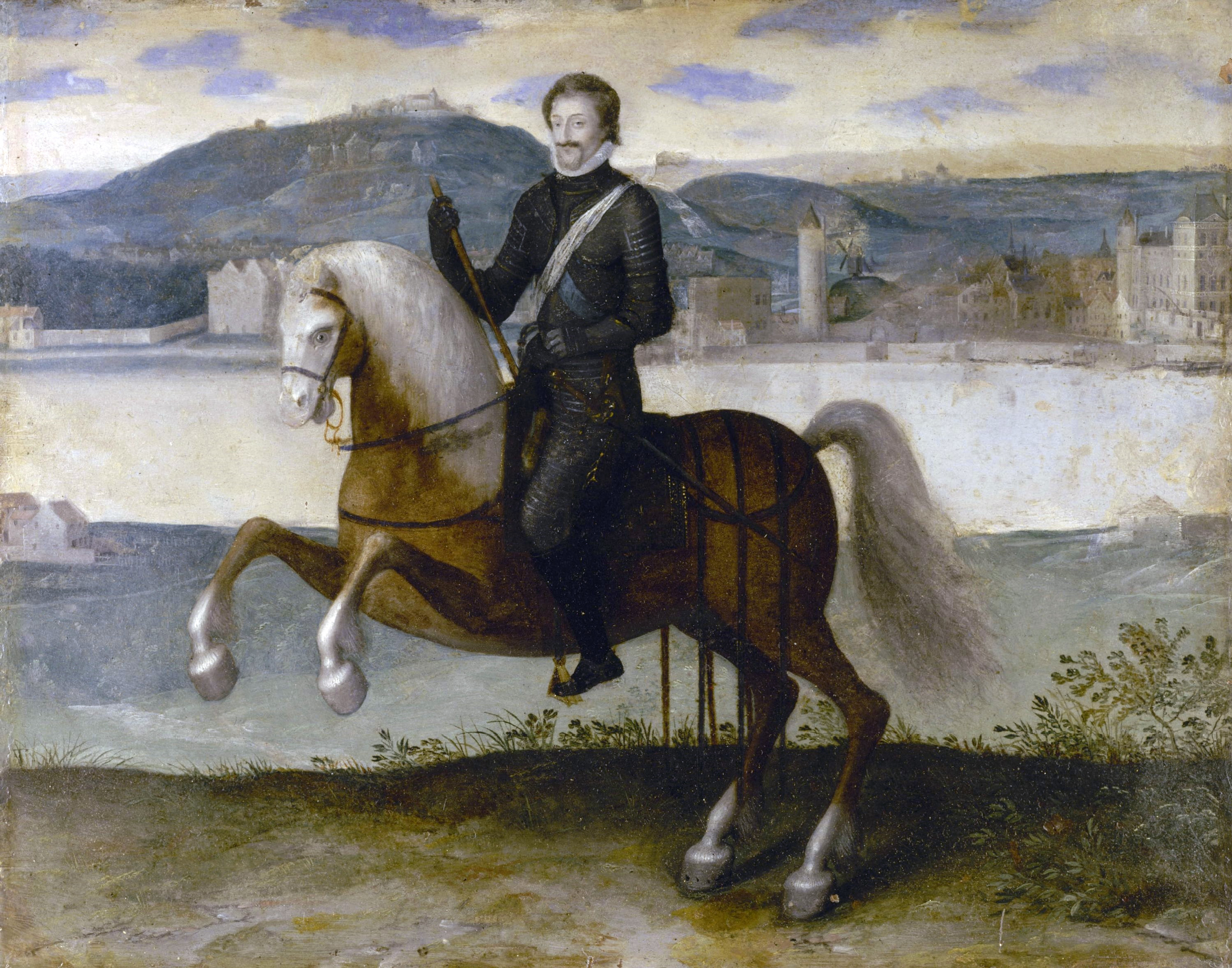
Late-16th-century equestrian portrait of Henry IV of France, with the Pavillon de Roi visible at the far right

Pierre Lescot designed the Pavillon du Roi in the context of the partial rebuilding of the Louvre initiated by Francis I in the mid-1540s and continued by Francis's successor Henry II. Its construction was started in 1553 and completed in 1556. The tall building became a kind of visual substitute for the former medieval Louvre Tower (grosse tour du Louvre) which Francis I had demolished in 1528. It had exterior façades on the west and south, for which Lescot adopted an understated design with bossaged quoins directly inspired by those designed by Antonio da Sangallo the Younger for Rome's Palazzo Farnese in the previous decade. On the ground floor, Lescot created arched windows whose design became extremely influential, in the Louvre specifically as they were copied by generations of architects including those of the Louvre Colonnade, and in French classical architecture more generally.

Inside, on the ground floor were the chambers of the Royal Council. In 1672, the Académie Française was relocated there by Jean-Baptiste Colbert. A small spiral staircase, the petit degré du Roi, connects to the upper floors; it still exists but is not accessible to the public.

On the first floor were the two main rooms of the Royal Apartment: the bedroom proper from the time of Henry IV (French: chambre à coucher, also known as the chambre du lit or chambre à alcôve), and a larger ceremonial room further west known as the chambre de parade or chambre dorée, where the King would hold court and receive ambassadors. These were accessed from the upper main room of the Lescot Wing through the king's antechamber, from which they are separated by a narrow corridor that was made accessible again during a renovation in 2021. To the east of the king's chamber was the small petit cabinet du Roi and further east, the queen consort's apartment; to the west a corridor, created under Henry IV and enlarged in the 1660s, led to the Petite Galerie, Grande Galerie and Tuileries Palace.

On the second floor was an apartment which was used in the 17th century by the king's most powerful relatives or officials, successively Charles d'Albert, 1st Duke of Luynes, Gaston, Duke of Orléans, Cardinal Mazarin, Nicolas Fouquet and Jean-Baptiste Colbert until the court's departure to Versailles in the 1670s. The third floor was set up as a vast Italian-style belvedere, sometimes known as the Grand Cabinet.

=== 19th-century transformations ===
Between 1806 and 1817 the Louvre's architect Pierre Fontaine gutted the entire structure, demolished the upper levels to harmonize it with the flat-roofline design of the Louvre Colonnade, and rebuilt the interiors on entirely new plans. On the ground floor, Fontaine created a large room, now centered on the Venus de Milo, and a smaller transitional space opening on the Salle des Caryatides, known as the Corridor de Pan; like the adjacent southern wing, Fontaine decorated them in a streamlined neoclassical style. On the first floor, Fontaine had the panelling and ceiling woodwork of the chambre à alcôve and chambre de parade deposed. In 1829 he reassembled them in two rooms of the Colonnade Wing, where they are now part of the Department of Egyptian Antiquities. Fontaine then merged all the pavilion's former first-floor and second-floor spaces, including the never-finished 1668 extension to the south, into a single large high-ceilinged and skylit room, which became known as the salle des sept-cheminées. That room only received a permanent decoration in 1849-1851 under Fontaine's successor Félix Duban, with stucco sculptures by Francisque Joseph Duret whose delicate colors were revealed after cleaning in 2020–2021. What remains of the Pavillon du Roi has been left essentially unchanged since then.

== Gallery ==
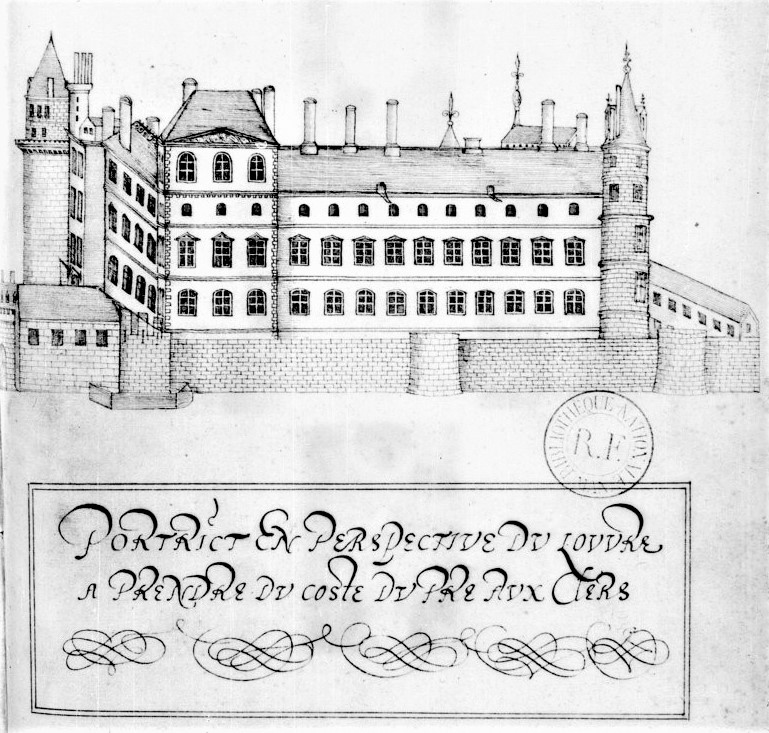
Perspective view from the south, engraving from the 1580s

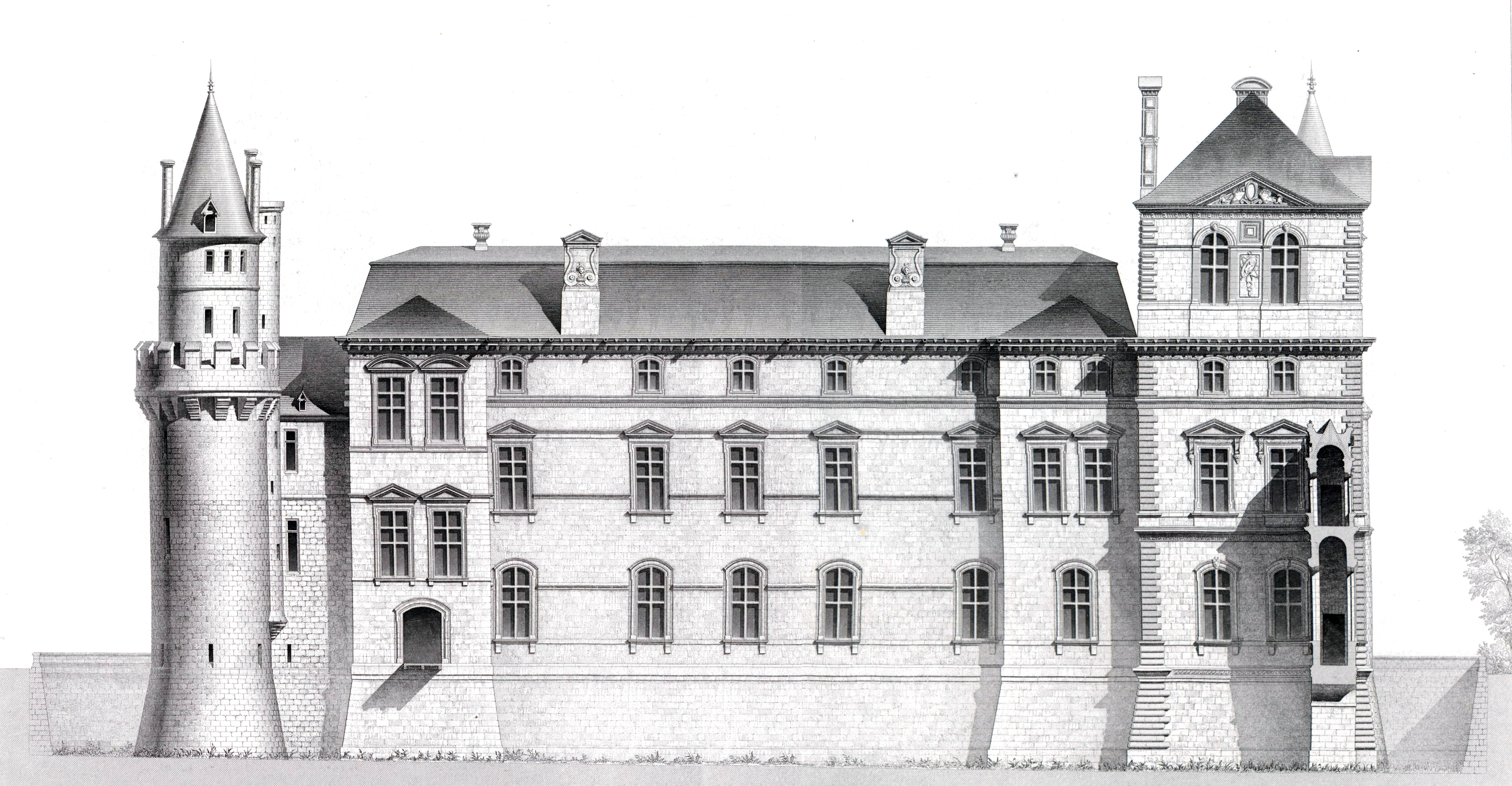
Western elevation of the Louvre in the early 17th century with the Pavillon du Roi on the right, reconstruction by Henri Legrand (1868)

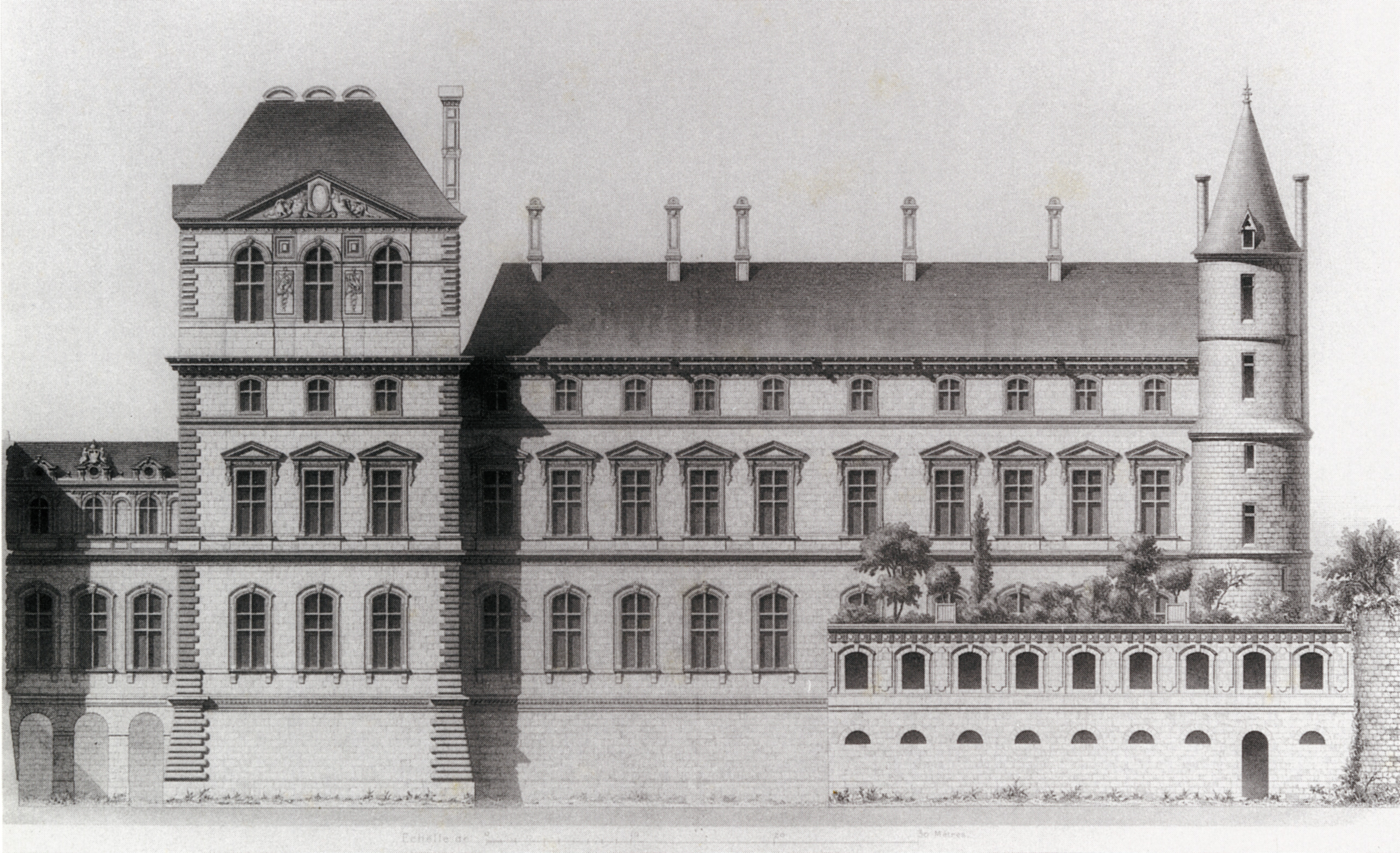
Southern elevation ca.1650 with the Pavillon du Roi on the left, reconstruction by Henri Legrand (1868)

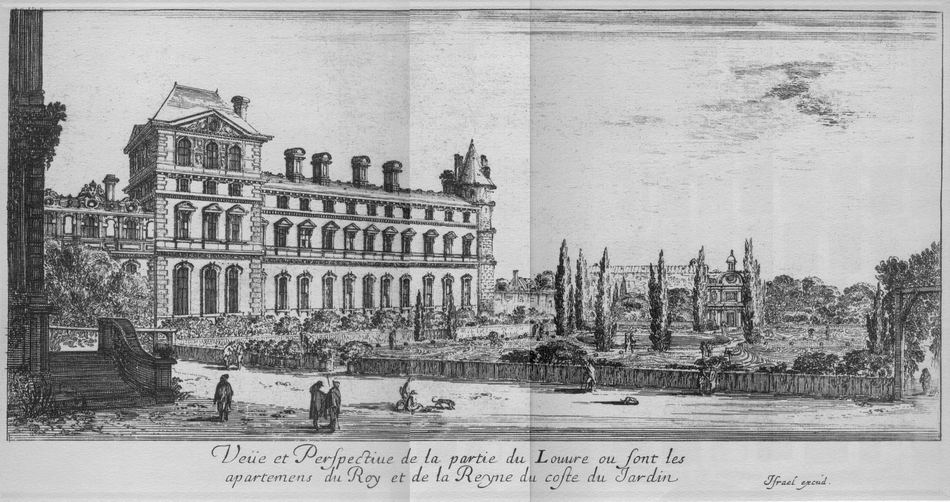
South facade ca.1650, engraving by Israël Silvestre

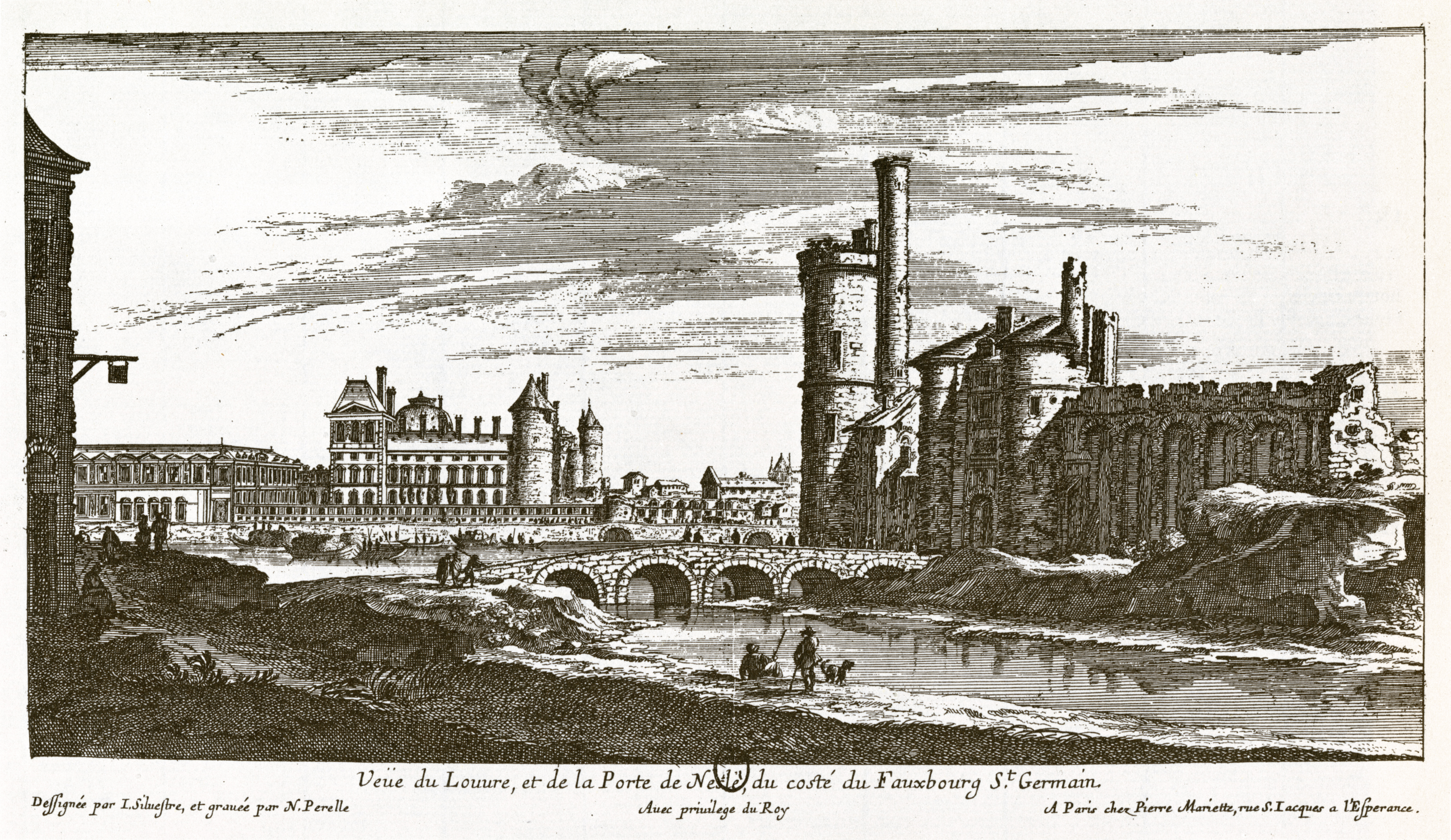
View from the left bank ca.1650, by Israël Silvestre

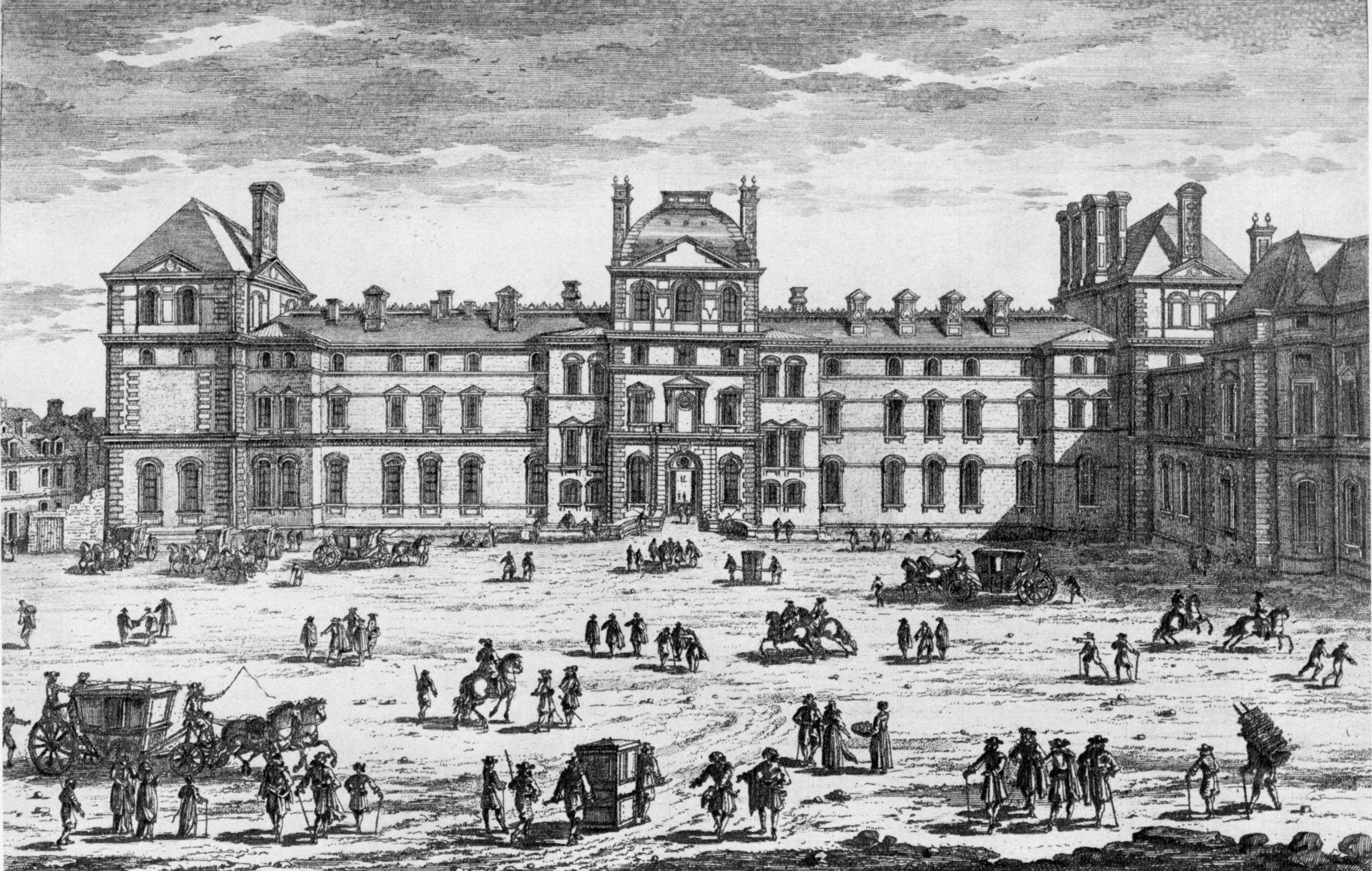
Louvre western front ca.1665, by Gabriel Perelle, with the Pavillon du Roi on the right

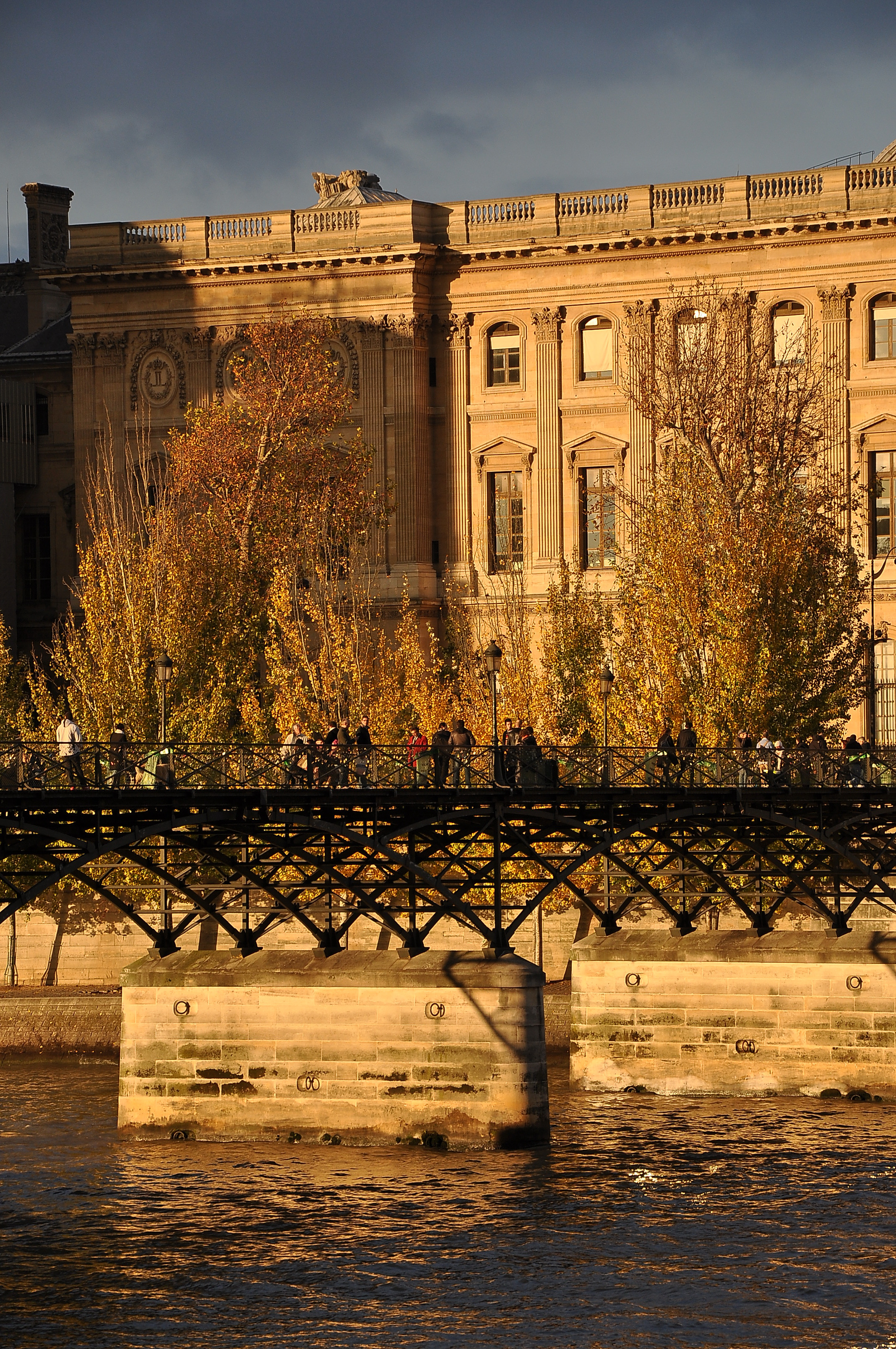
The original Pavillon du Roi has been hidden since 1668 by the new southern façade of the Louvre, designed by Claude Perrault and completed by Percier and Fontaine around 1806

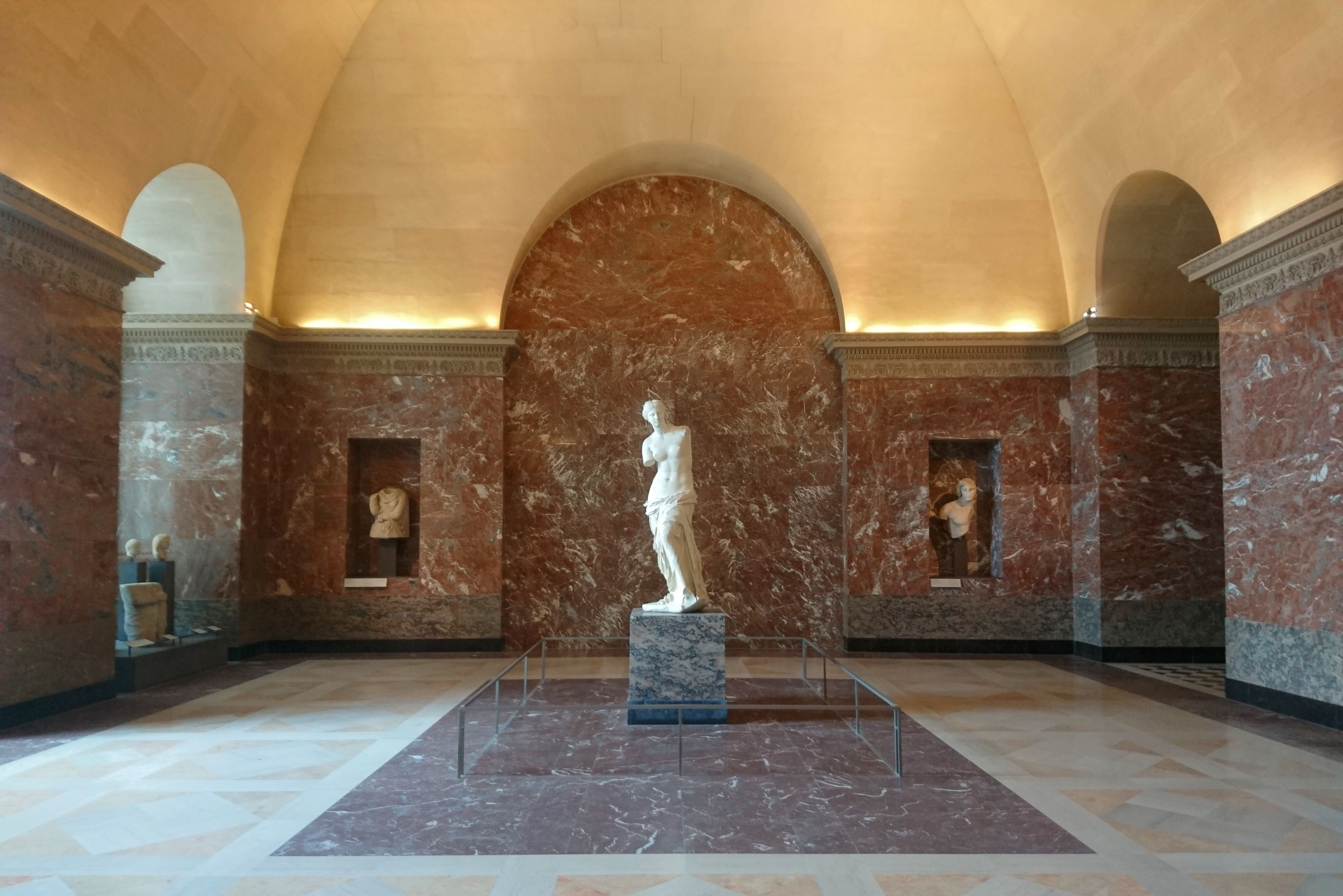
The large room created in 1817 on the ground floor, now Salle de la Vénus de Milo

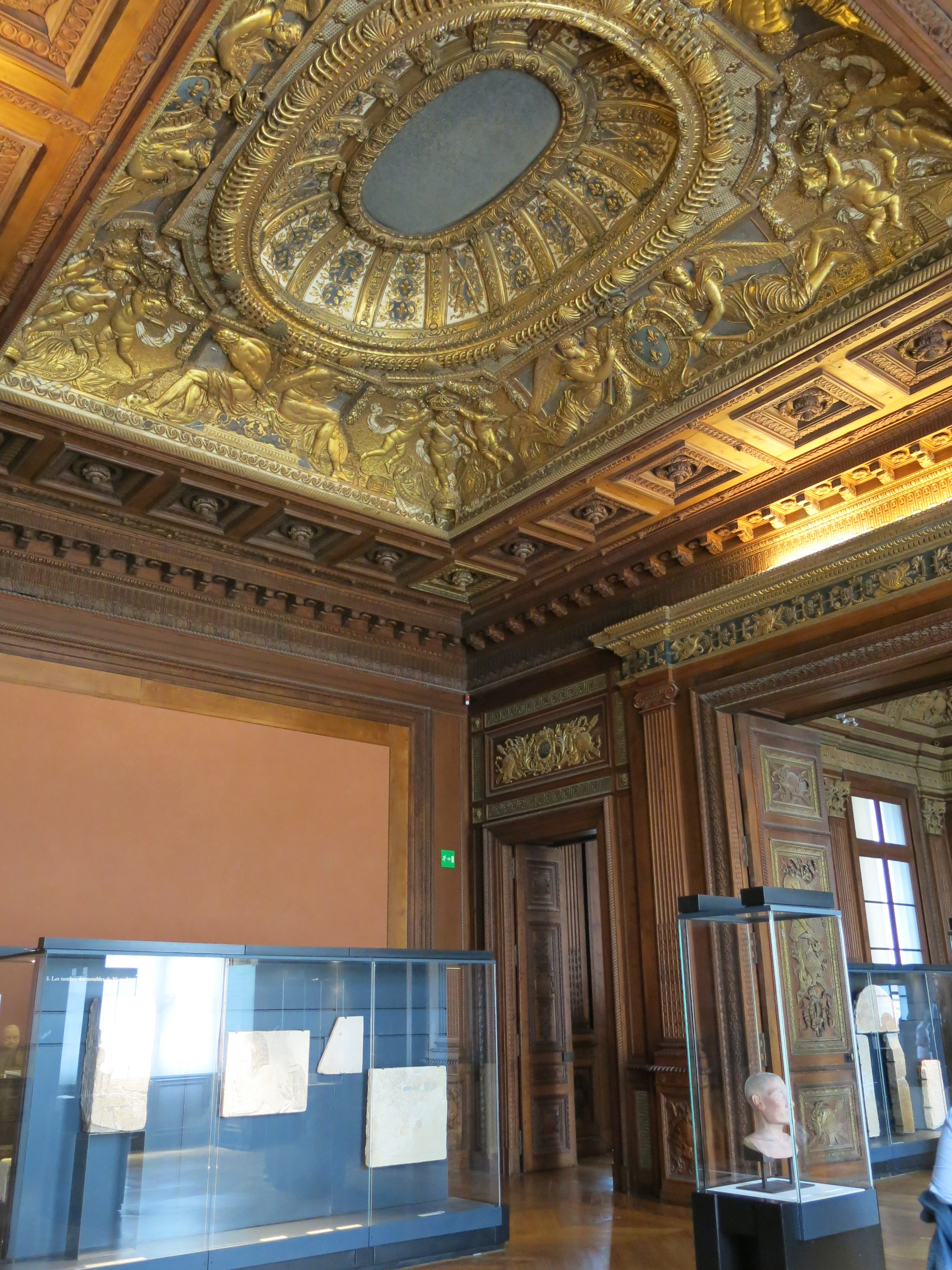
The chambre à alcôve du roi as rebuilt in the Colonnade Wing

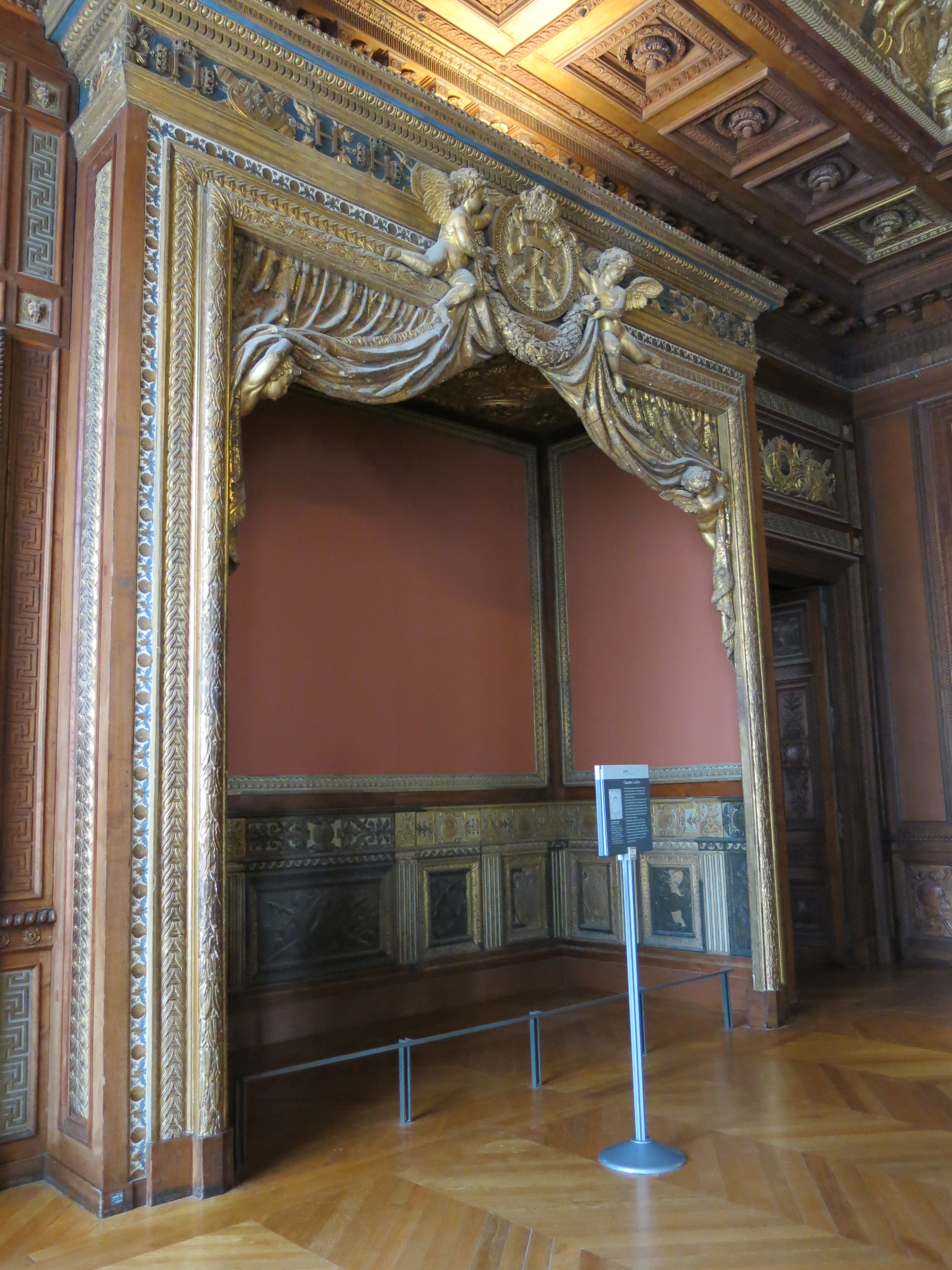
Detail of the chamber's alcove

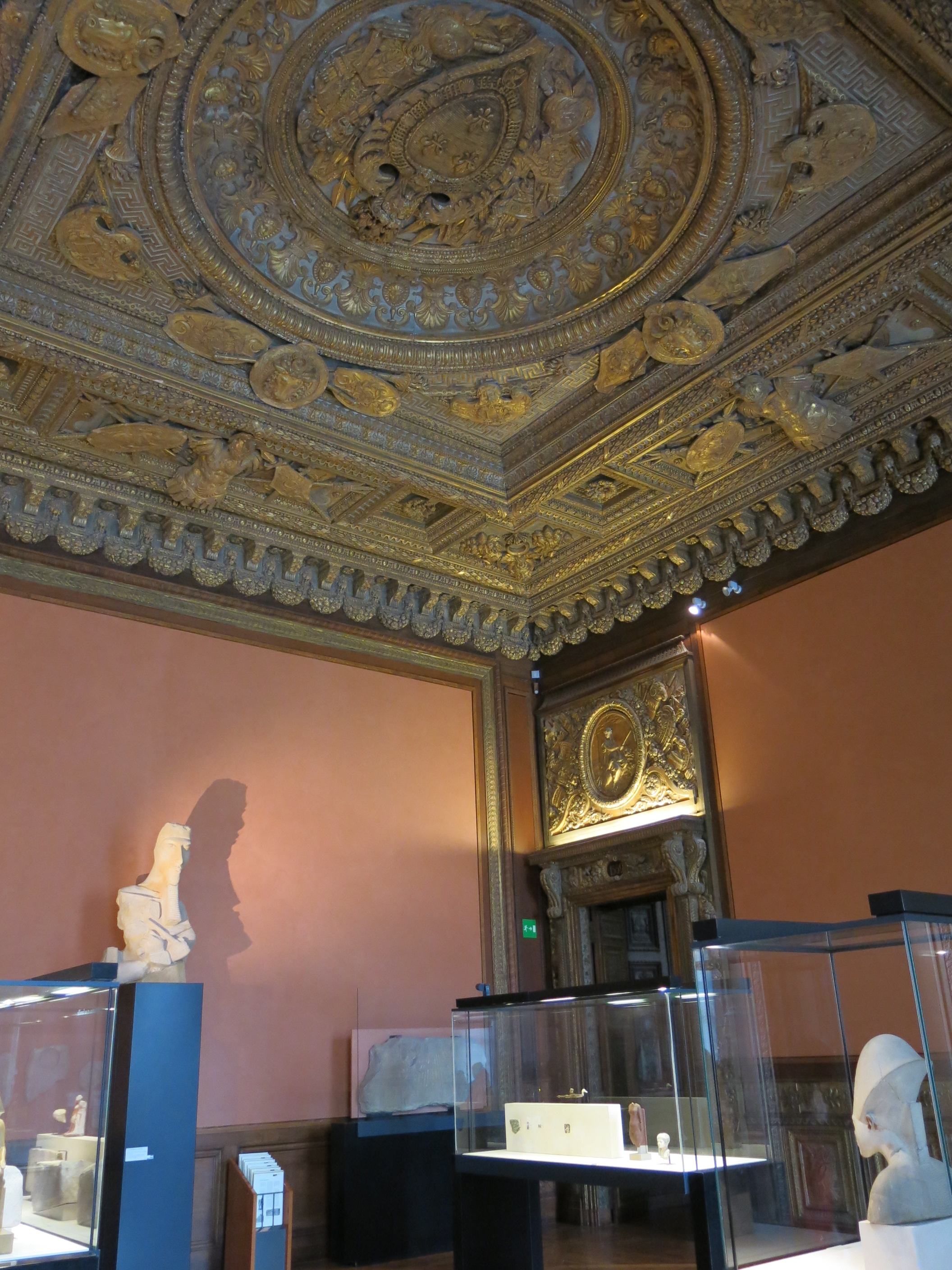
The chambre de parade as rebuilt in the Colonnade Wing

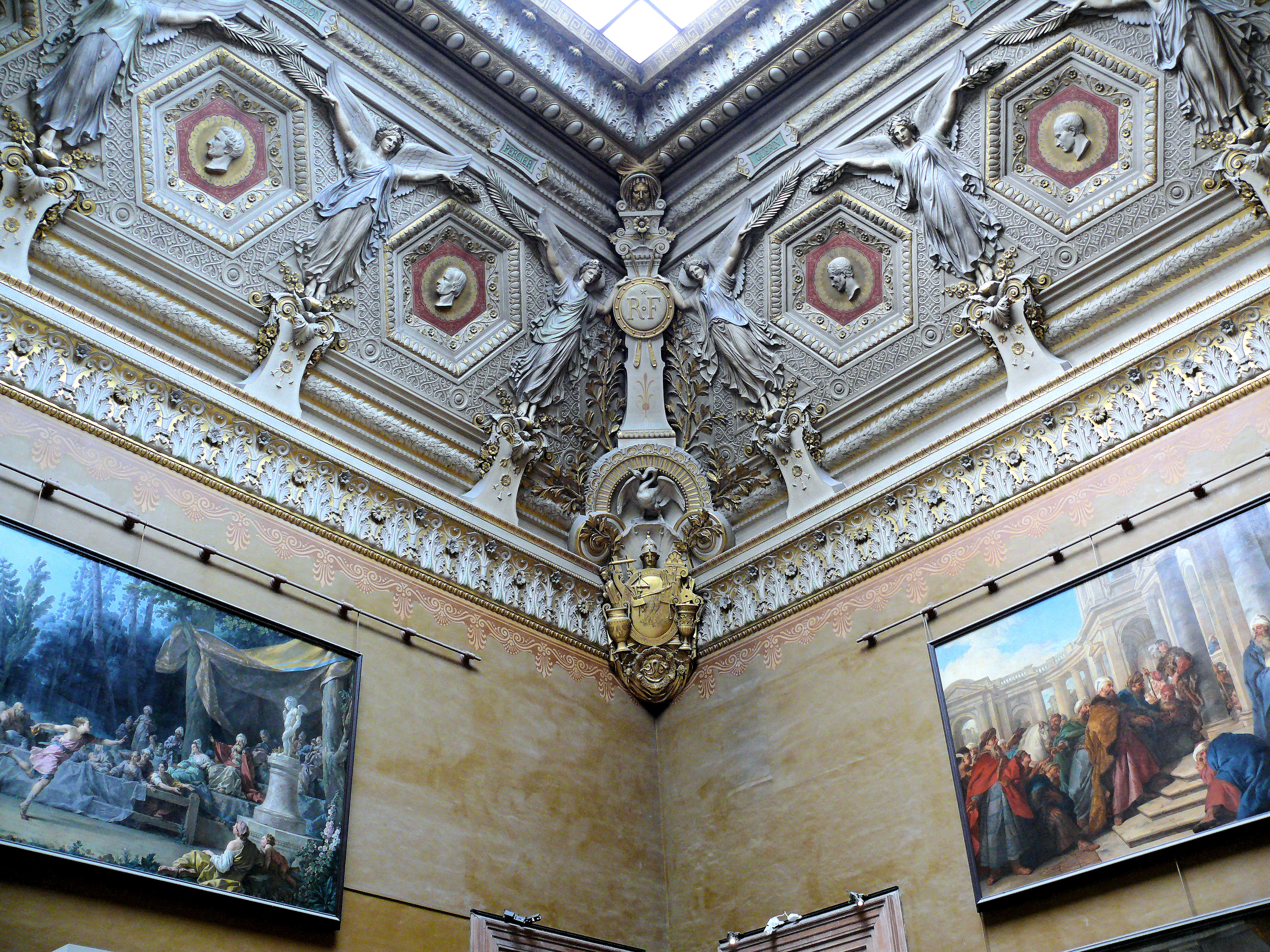
The salle des sept-cheminées as decorated by Duban

== See also ==
- Medieval Louvre
- Place des Vosges and Château de Vincennes both include structures also known as Pavillon du Roi
