= Samuel Jacob Rubinstein =

20th century French orthodox Chief Rabbi

Samuel Jacob (Shmuel Yaakov) Rubinstein was a 20th-century French orthodox Chief Rabbi. He was born in Poland.

== Biography ==
Rabbi Rubinstein was the rabbi of the Agoudas Hakehilos Synagogue, succeeding Chief Rabbi Joël Leib HaLevi Herzog.

After World War II, he contributed to the renewal of French Jewry and was active in the return of Jewish children entrusted to non-Jewish families during the war. He was in touch with humanitarian organizations such as Vaad Hatzalah.

Rubinstein considered himself a Kotzker Ḥasīd, influenced by Hassidic master Menachem Mendel of Kotzk, the founder of Ger.

Roger Peyrefitte describes Rubinstein in his book The Jews.

At his funeral in the Synagogue de la rue Pavée, eulogies were given for Rabbi Rubinstein in Yiddish and French by Rabbi David Feuerwerker. Among the rabbis present that day was Chief Rabbi Ernest Gugenheim. His successor was Chief Rabbi Chaim Yaakov Rottenberg, from Antwerp.

The grandchildren of Rubinstein, Rafi (Raphaël) Shimoni, Dr. Marc Klutstein, and Evy Kuppershmidt, live in Israel.

== Bibliography ==
- Roger Peyrefitte, The Jews. A Fictional Venture Into The Follies Of Antisemitism. Bobbs-Merrill: New York City, 1965.
- Ruth Blau. Les Gardiens De La Cité. Histoire D'Une Guerre Sainte. Flammarion: Paris, 1978. ISBN 2-08-064118-2
- Nancy L. Green. The Pletzl of Paris. Jewish Immigrant Workers in the Belle Epoque. Holmes & Meier: New York & London, 1986 ISBN 0841909954
- Joseph Friedenson & David Kranzler. Heroine Of Rescue. The incredible story of Recha Sternbuch who saved thousands from the Holocaust. Mesorah Publications: Brooklyn, N.Y., 1984, 1999 ISBN 0-89906-460-4
- Elie Feuerwerker. Viewing And Kissing Tzitzit. Letter to the Editor. The Jewish Press, New York, Friday, January 24, 2003, p. 76
- Gutta Sternbuch & David Kranzler. Gutta: Memories of a Vanished World. A Bais Yaakov Teacher's Poignant Account of the War Years With a Historical Overview. Feldheim: Jerusalem, New York, 2005. ISBN 1-58330-779-6
- Marc B. Shapiro. Between The Yeshiva World And Modern Orthodoxy. The Life and Works of Rabbi Jehiel Jacob Weinberg 1884-1996. The Littman Library of Jewish Civilization: Oxford, Portland, Oregon, 2007. ISBN 978-1-874774-91-4
- Esther Farbstein. The Forgotten Memoirs. Moving Personal Accounts from Rabbis who Survived the Holocaust. Shaar Press: New York, 2011. ISBN 1-4226-1106-X,ISBN 978-1-4226-1106-7
