= David Feuerwerker =

French Jewish rabbi and professor of Jewish history (1912-1980)

- Born: October 2, 1912; Geneva, Switzerland
- Died: June 20, 1980 (aged 67); Montreal, Quebec, Canada
- Resting place: Jerusalem, Israel
- Occupations: Rabbi, Historian
- Spouse: Antoinette Feuerwerker
- Children: Atara, Natania, Elie, Hillel, Emmanuel, Benjamine
- Parent(s): Jacob Feuerwerker and Regina Neufeld

David Feuerwerker (October 2, 1912 – June 20, 1980) was a French Jewish rabbi and professor of Jewish history who was effective in the resistance to German occupation the Second World War. He was completely unsuspected until six months before the war ended, when he fled to Switzerland and his wife and baby went underground in France. The French government cited him for his bravery with several awards. After the war, he and his wife re-established the Jewish community of Lyon. He settled in Paris, teaching at the Sorbonne. In 1966, he and his family, grown to six children, moved to Montreal, where he developed a department of Jewish studies at the University of Montreal.

== Early life ==
He was born on October 2, 1912, at 11 Rue du Mont-Blanc, in Geneva, Switzerland. He was the seventh of eleven children. His father Jacob Feuerwerker was born in Sighet, now Sighetu Marmației, Maramureş, then Austria-Hungary, now Romania. His mother Regina Neufeld was born in Lackenbach, one of the famous seven Jewish communities or Sheva Kehillos (Siebengemeinden) in the Burgenland, Hungary, now Austria. The family moved to France because Jacob was unable to work as a shochet, a trained ritual slaughterer, in Switzerland.

In 1925, he completed his primary school education at the Rue Vauquelin Talmud Torah school in Paris, and after receiving his baccalauréat in science, literature and philosophy, he entered the rabbinical school Séminaire israélite de France in 1932. Beginning in 1933, he simultaneously studied Semitic languages at the prestigious École pratique des hautes études, where he received the Diplôme de l’EPHE, a postgraduate degree. Among the languages he spoke were Aramaic and Syriac. He became a naturalized French citizen in 1936, and was ordained a rabbi on October 1, 1937.

== Second World War ==
=== Military service and recognition ===
From October 15, 1937, until September 1, 1939, he served in the French Army, in Alsace. After World War II broke out, he remained in the army until July 25, 1940. He was in charge of communications for a group of artillery of the 12th R.A.D. (Régiment d'Artillerie Divisionnaire) and chaplain of the 87th D.I.A. He was demobilized at Châteauroux on July 25, 1940.

He received the Croix de guerre 1939-1945 (France) with a bronze star.

The citation to the Order of the Brigade reads as follows:

As chief of artillery communications has participated from September 1939 to February 1940 in the engagements in Alsace in the region of Bitche. Has shown drive, courage, and competence in assuring under fire the phone and radio contacts. Distinguished himself again during the combats of June 1940 on the Ailette, the Aisne, and the Seine, as Jewish Chaplain of his Division. Has contributed to maintain the fighting spirit around him and to uphold the morale of the engaged units.

A second citation for the Croix de guerre 1939-1945 (France) was to the Order of the Army, with palm.

=== Rabbi of Brive and of three départements ===
In 1940, he was nominated rabbi of three French Departments: Corrèze, Creuse, and Lot, based in Brive-la-Gaillarde. He lived at Villa du Mont-Blanc, avenue Turgot, in Brive. He created his first Study Circle (Cercle d'Etudes).

The Jewish population consisted of numerous refugees, including a large segment originating from Alsace and other regions occupied by the Nazi invader. He helped numerous of them to find a country of refuge, with the help of the oldest agency dealing with refugees in the United States, the HIAS. Among the destinations, Cuba. For himself, there was no thought of leaving France, since he was a community leader. He succeeded in liberating many internees from transit camps in France, including the camp at Gurs. He helped Benoit Mandelbrot in the pursuit of his studies.

=== In the Résistance ===
In Brive with Edmond Michelet, later to be a senior minister under Charles de Gaulle, he participated actively in the French Résistance Movement "Combat" against the Nazi occupation. His name in the French Résistance was "Jacques Portal". He received the Croix du combattant volontaire 1939–1945, the Medaille Commémorative de la Guerre 1939–1945 with the bar "France".

He was to be made Knight (Chevalier) of the Legion of Honor (Légion d'honneur) for his military activities. The Citation says:

Despite the exceptional risks which were attached to his ministry, has participated in an active, permanent and unselfish way to the organisation of the resistance in all the region.

Has not hesitated to risk his freedom, and without any doubt his life, to be for the Movement "Combat" an auxiliary particularly serious.

It's due to him that many hundreds of resistants owed their false identification papers which allowed them to escape the searches by the Gestapo.

His wife, Antoinette Feuerwerker (née Gluck), who had finished law school in Strasbourg before the war, and whom he married at the beginning of the war, participated with him in the underground. Combattant Volontaire de la Résistance, in 1944 she was awarded the French Liberation Medal (Médaille de la France Libérée), "for her participation in the liberation of France".

=== Jacques Soustelle and the passage to Switzerland ===
Six months before the end of World War II, the Germans finally understood that the Rabbi of Brive was an active member of the Résistance. But the Rabbi got ahead of the occupier. After receiving reliable information that he was on the list of people to be arrested by the Gestapo, he decided to act. His arrest and his probable disappearance would not advance the cause he defended, day after day. He took the difficult decision, in agreement with his spouse, Antoinette Feuerwerker, to leave Brive. Only one destination was possible, Switzerland.

Antoinette Feuerwerker obtained from Jacques Soustelle, a future minister of Charles de Gaulle and later his opponent, but then a leader of the Résistance, information how to reach clandestinely neutral territory, in Divonne-les-Bains. Once in his native city of Geneva, he was imprisoned by the Swiss authorities. But his life was not in immediate danger. Once Lyon had been liberated, in which he participated, he resumed the task of rebuilding the Jewish community of Lyon and of France, then in disarray.

Antoinette Feuerwerker had remained in France for the last six months of the war. In order to evade the Germans and deportation, she went underground with her baby daughter, Atara. Once the war ended, the couple reunited in Lyon, for the adventure of reconstruction of the post-war French Judaism.

== Chief rabbi of Lyon, at the Libération ==
He participated in the liberation of Lyon as the captain-chaplain (Capitaine-Aumônier) of the French Forces of the Interior (Forces Françaises de l'Intérieur, F.F.I.), In Lyon in 1944. He became the chief rabbi of Lyon at the Liberation, rabbi of the Great Synagogue 13, Quai Tilsit, Lyon 2. He became also the captain-chaplain of the Place de Lyon and of the Alpine Division (27^{e} brigade d'infanterie de montagne).

He spoke at the ceremony commemorating the Liberation of Lyon, at Place Bellecour.

His activities included liaising with the former Prime Minister of France, Édouard Herriot and the Roman Catholic primate of the Gauls, Cardinal Pierre-Marie Gerlier, later, recognized as a Righteous Among the Nations, by Yad Vashem, Jerusalem, Israel.

He published in Lyon, the first weekly Jewish newspaper since the war, called L'Unité ("Unity").

== Post-War ==
In 1946, he was elected rabbi in Neuilly-sur-Seine, near Paris, where he established a Cercle d'Etudes (Study Circle) at 12 rue Ancelle. The money destined for the Aliyah Bet ship Exodus was hidden, without his knowledge, by his wife, Antoinette Feuerwerker, under his bed, since no one would suspect him.

In 1948, he became rabbi of Les Tournelles, the Great Synagogue in Paris. In the Cercle d'Etudes du Marais he formed at 14 Place des Vosges, in the heart of Le Marais, the lecturers included: Raymond Aron, Robert Aron, Henri Baruk, le Père Marie-Benoît, Jean Cassou, Georges Duhamel, Marcel Dunan, Edmond Fleg, Henri Hertz, Louis Kahn, Joseph Kessel, Jacques Madaule, Arnold Mandel, Szolem Mandelbrojt, François Mauriac, Edmond Michelet, Pierre Morhange, François Perroux, le Père Michel Riquet, Pierre-Maxime Schuhl, André Spire, Jean Wahl, and many others.

In an assessment of "European Jewry Ten Years After The War", and of France, in particular, Arnold Mandel writes in 1956: "Under the auspices of a very dynamic, forceful and militant rabbi David Feuerwerker a free debating club the Circle du Marais has been active for several years. Situated in one of the most beautiful squares in Paris, the Place des Vosges where the Victor Hugo Museum is located, the club, where the discussions are sometimes stormy, is one of the liveliest and most picturesque spots in the Jewish quarter of the French capital. It is Hyde Park with more spirit."

Roger Berg writes en 1992 on the Cercle d'Études du Marais: "Sometime after the end of World War II, and before the sudden emergence of television in homes, study circles were created all over, the most prestigious among them was the Circle of the Marais of David Feuerwerker." The French Jewish Community paid tribute to him, on December 23, 1956, on the occasion of his twentieth year in the Rabbinate and of the two hundred and fiftieth Session of the Cercle d'Etudes du Marais, to as it specified, Honor the guide and the master whose activity is creative and efficient for the Jewish Community of France.

He was the head of Jewish Education (Directeur de l'instruction religieuse) (Paris) (1952), and vice president of the Council for Education and Jewish Culture in France (Conseil pour l'Education et la Culture Juive en France, CECJF) (1953).

The City of Paris, and in its name, the municipal council, in its session of December 14, 1957, awarded to him the Gold Medal of the City of Paris.

== Teacher and orator ==
On diverse occasions, his talent as an orator was made to contribution. He participated on a regular basis to the Annual Commemoration at the Memorial of the Unknown Jewish Martyr (Mémorial du Martyr Juif Inconnu), with the attendance of civilian and military authorities. He gave the only funeral oration in French for the famous Rabbi Samuel Jacob Rubinstein of the Synagogue of the 10 rue Pavée in Paris 4 (Agoudas Hakehilos Synagogue). He spoke at a commemoration on the site of the camp at Drancy. He spoke also at the Grande Synagogue of Paris, rue de la Victoire in the 9th arrondissement of Paris.

In parallel to his rabbinical activities, he obtained a licence ès sciences and a Ph.D. in history from the Sorbonne. He taught at the Sorbonne EPHE 6ème section Ecole Pratique des Hautes Etudes from 1962 to 1965.

Among his many lectures, he spoke at the Societé de l'Histoire de Paris, and at the Institut Napoléon de Paris.

He published articles in, among other publications, La Revue Historique des Annales; Evidences; Bulletin de nos communautés; le Journal des communautés.

=== Chaplain ===
He created the position of chief chaplain of the French Navy. There had been no Jewish chaplain of the French Navy before him. He was based at the Centre Marine Pépinière, 15 rue Laborde, in Paris 8. He went on special missions in Algeria and Tunisia (at the navy base in Bizerte).

He was also chaplain of prisons (La Petite Roquette), Lycées (Lycée Henri-IV, Lycée Fénelon) and hospitals (Hôtel-Dieu de Paris) in Paris.

In 1963, General Charles de Gaulle nominated him to be officer of the Legion of Honor (Légion d'honneur), for his work for the French Navy.

=== Hebrew at the Baccalauréat ===
He introduced Hebrew as a foreign language for the French Baccalauréat, in 1954. He was the sole examiner for the city of Paris. To this day, it is offered as an option worldwide. Among those who were examined by him, and who remember vividly the questions, was Haïm Brezis, the future member of the French Academy of Sciences (Académie des sciences; France) and of the National Academy of Sciences (USA).

=== Famous contacts ===
He was close to Pierre Mendès France, the former Prime Minister of France. He led the funerals of both his parents. He befriended and helped Aimé Pallière (1868–1949), who has remained as the Noahide (B'nei Noah) par excellence.

The many Jewish leaders he met included Rabbi Avrohom Yeshaya Karelitz (1878–1953), the Chazon Ish, in Bnei Brak, Israel, and the Hassidic leader of Belz, Rabbi Aharon Rokeach (1877–1957), called Reb Arele, also, living in Israel.

After the Suez Crisis (Sinai War of 1956), when Moshe Dayan visited France, he represented the Jewish community, at a ceremony under the Arc of Triumph (Arc de Triomphe de l'Étoile), in Paris.

He became the rabbi of the Synagogue 15 Rue Chasseloup-Laubat (15th arrondissement of Paris).

== Move to Montreal ==
In 1966, he moved with his family (six children: Atara, Natania, Elie, Hillel, Emmanuel, and Benjamine) to Montreal, Quebec, Canada. He lived at 5583 Woodbury Avenue, in Montreal, a minute away from l'Université de Montréal. His neighbour, René Lévesque, the future premier of Quebec, paid tribute to him, in his own name, and in the name of the Quebec Government, when he died. He became professor of sociology at the Université de Montréal, from 1966 to 1968, and then created at that university a department of Jewish Studies. He became judge in the rabbinical court (Beth Din) of that city, and a member of the Vaad Hair (Jewish Community Council of Montreal), beside the chief rabbi of Montreal, Pinhas Hirschprung.

He introduced Rabbi Moshe Feinstein (1895–1986), the halakhic authority of his time, to the mayor of Montreal, Jean Drapeau at the Montreal City Hall. He was the editor of the French section of the Voice of the Vaad journal, called "la Voix du Conseil".

=== Other activities ===
Among his many publications, he wrote the classic book on the emancipation of the French Jews, which is still cited today. For this work L'Emancipation des Juifs en France de l'Ancien Régime à la Fin du Second Empire (Albin Michel: Paris, 1976), he was awarded the Broquette-Gonin Prize for history from the Académie Française. A review of the book appeared on the front page of the newspaper Le Monde.

He appeared on French and Canadian television and radio, was called often as an expert and lectured extensively. He had a special interest in Jewish music. He organized the appearance of the famous Hazzan Moshe Koussevitzky, at the Synagogue de la rue des Tournelles, in Paris. He also was a guest on several occasions on the radio show, animated by Alain Stanké, called "La musique des nations" of Radio-Canada.

=== Death in Montreal and burial in Jerusalem ===
He died in Montreal on June 20, 1980, and was buried in Sanhedria in Jerusalem, Israel.

== Bibliography ==
- David Feuerwerker. L'Emancipation Des Juifs En France. De L'Ancien Régime à la Fin Du Second Empire. Albin Michel: Paris, 1976. ISBN 2-226-00316-9

Many books refer to his activities, particularly for his work in the Resistance. Among them :

- Pierre Trouillé. Journal D'Un Préfet Pendant L'Occupation. nrf, Gallimard: Paris, 1964.
- Roger Peyreffite. Les Juifs. Flammarion: Paris, 1964.
- Roger Peyreffite. The Jews. A Fictional Venture into the Follies of Antisemitism. The Bobbs-Merrill Company: New York City, 1967.
- Lucien Steinberg. Not As a Lamb. The Jews Against Hitler. Saxon House: England, 1974. ISBN 0-347-00003-7
- Ruth Blau. Les Gardiens De La Cité. Histoire D'une Guerre Sainte. Flammarion: Paris, 1978. ISBN 2-08-064118-2
- Edmond Michelet. Rue de La Liberté. Dachau 1943-1945. Seuil: Paris, 1983 [First Edition was in 1955]. [Lettre-Préface de Charles de Gaulle; aussi avec Préface pour l'édition allemande de Konrad Adenauer]. ISBN 2-02-003025-X
- Raymond Aron. Mémoires. 50 ans de réflexion politique. Julliard: Paris, 1983. ISBN 2-260-00332-X, ISBN 2-266-01500-1 & ISBN 2-266-01501-X
- Bernard Lecornu. Un Préfet Sous L'Occupation Allemande. Chateaubriant, Saint-Nazaire, Tulle. Editions France-Empire: Paris, 1984. [Préface de Maurice Schumann de l'Académie Française]. ISBN 2-7048-0372-2
- Allen Gotheil. Les Juifs Progressistes Au Québec. Editions Par Ailleurs: Montréal, 1988. ISBN 2-9801242-0-6
- Raymond Aron. Memoirs. Fifty Years of Political Reflection. Holmes & Meier: New York City, 1990. [Foreword by Henry A. Kissinger]. ISBN 0-8419-1113-4 & ISBN 0-8419-1114-2
- Ysrael Gutman and Avital Saf, Editors. She'erit Hapletah, 1944-1948. Rehabilitation and Political Struggle. Proceedings of the Sixth Yad Vashem International Historical Conference. Jerusalem, October 1985. Yad Vashem: Jerusalem, 1990.
- Roger Berg. Histoire du rabbinat français. Patrimoines. Judaïsme. Cerf: Paris, 1992. [Préface du grand rabbin Jacob Kaplan, membre de l'Institut]. ISBN 2-204-04252-8
- Nicolas Baverez. Raymond Aron. Flammarion: Paris, 1993.
- Renée Poznanski. Etre juif en France pendant la Seconde Guerre Mondiale. Hachette: Paris, 1994. ISBN 2-01-013109-6
- Asher Cohen. History of the Holocaust. France. Yad Vashem: Jerusalem, 1996. ISBN 965-308-053-9
- Donna F. Ryan. The Holocaust & the Jews of Marseille. The Enforcement of Anti-Semitic Policies in Vichy France. University of Illinois Press: Urbana And Chicago, 1996. ISBN 0-252-06530-1
- Anne Grynberg. Les camps de la honte. Les internés juifs des camps français 1939-1944. La Découverte: Paris, 1999. ISBN 2-7071-3046-X
- Georges Vadnaï. Grand Rabbin de Lausanne. Jamais la lumière ne s'est éteinte: un destin juif dans les ténèbres du siècle. L'Age d'homme, 1999, p. 84. ISBN 2-8251-1241-0, ISBN 978-2-8251-1241-0
- Catherine Poujol. Aimé Pallière (1868–1949). Un chrétien dans le judaïsme. Desclée de Brouwer: Paris, 2003. ISBN 2-220-05316-4
- Benoit M. Mandelbrot. The Fractalist. Memoir of a Scientific Maverick. First Vintage Books Edition: New York, 2013. ISBN 978-0-307-38991-6

Among the articles written about David Feuerwerker are:

- Elie Feuerwerker. Le Rabbin Dr. David Feuerwerker, ZT"L (2 Octobre 1912-20 Juin 1980/ 21 Tichri 5673-6 Tamouz 5740). Le Combat d'Une Vie. Revue d'Histoire de la Médecine Hébraïque, Paris, 1980. [Mentioned in Gad Freudenthal & Samuel S. Kottek, editors, Mélanges D'Histoire De La Médecine Hébraïque: Etudes Choisies De La Revue D'Histoire De La Médecine Hébraïque (1948–1985). Brill: Netherlands, 2003], p. 573. ISBN 978-90-04-12522-3]
- François Perroux. Souvenir de David Feuerwerker. Revue d'Histoire de la Médecine Hébraïque, Paris, 1981.
- Catherine Poujol. David Feuerwerker, Rabbin, Résistant, Enseignant, Historien. Archives Juives, Paris, 2002.
- Valery Bazarov. "In The Cross-Hairs: HIAS And The French Resistance." The Hidden Child. Vol. XXI, 2013, p. 8-11. [Published by Hidden Child Foundation/ADL, New York].
