= Place des Vosges =

Square in Paris, France

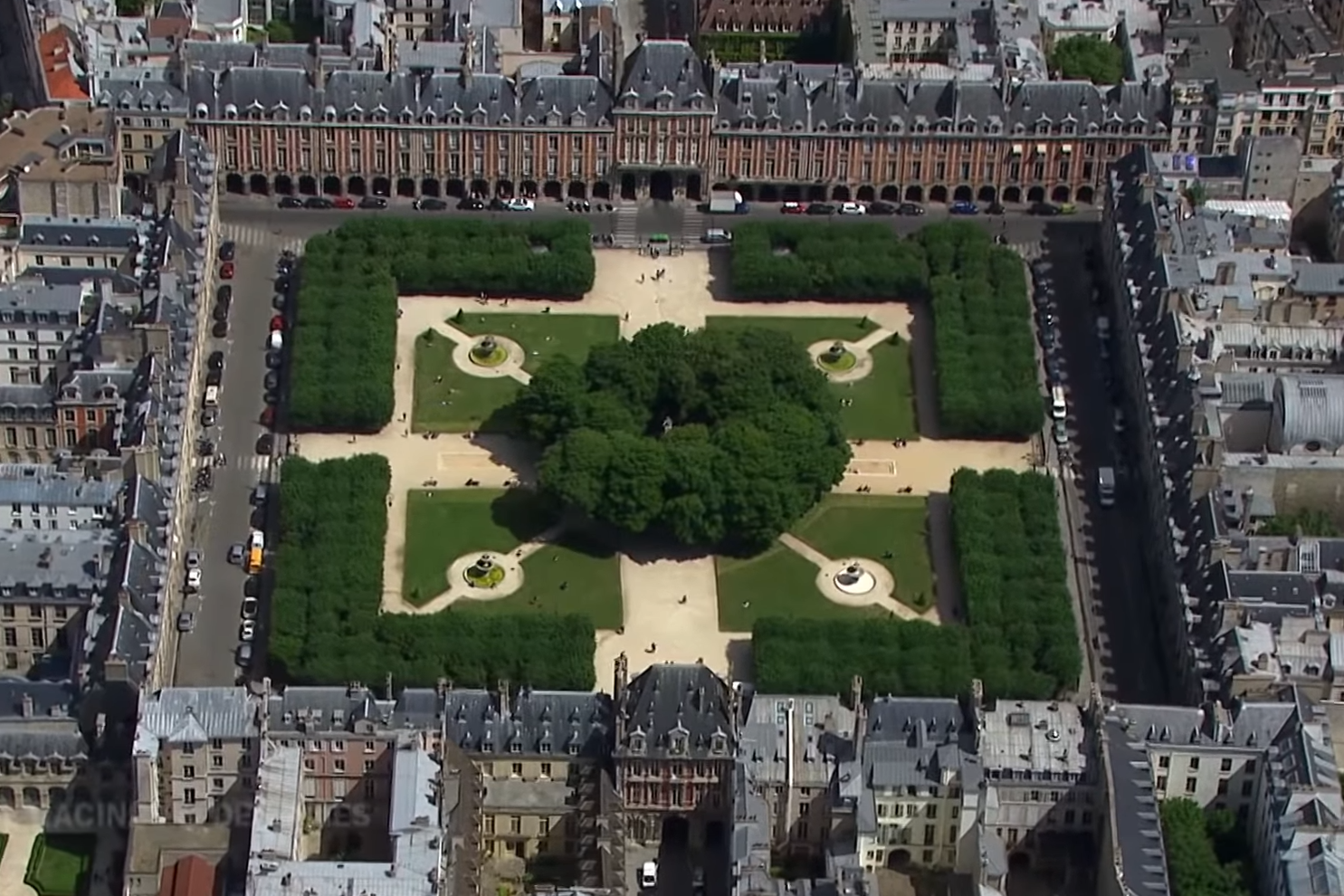
- Aerial view of the Place des Vosges

- Location within Paris
- Length: 140 m (460 ft)
- Width: 140 m (460 ft)
- Arrondissement: 3rd, 4th
- Quarter: Archives. Arsenal.
- Coordinates: 48°51′20″N 2°21′56″E
- From: rue de Birague, 11 bis
- To: rue de Béarn, 1

Construction
- Completed: July 1605

The Place des Vosges (French: [plas de voʒ]; lit. 'Vosges Square'), originally the Place Royale ('Royal Square'), is the oldest planned square in Paris, just before the Place Dauphine. It is located in the Marais district, and it straddles the dividing-line between the 3rd and 4th arrondissements. It is an enclosed square, accessible via a main street on one of its four sides and two streets running beneath pavilions. It was a fashionable and expensive square to live in during the 17th and 18th centuries, and one of the main reasons for the chic nature of the Marais among the Parisian nobility. Along with the Place des Victoires, the Place Dauphine, the Place Vendôme and the Place de la Concorde, it is one of the five royal squares in Paris.

== History ==
Originally known as the Place Royale, the Place des Vosges was built by Henry IV of France from 1605 to 1612. A true square (140 m × 140 m), it embodied one of the first European programs of royal city planning (Plaza Mayor in Madrid, begun in 1590, precedes it). It was built on the site of the Hôtel des Tournelles and its gardens, which were demolished by Catherine de' Medici.

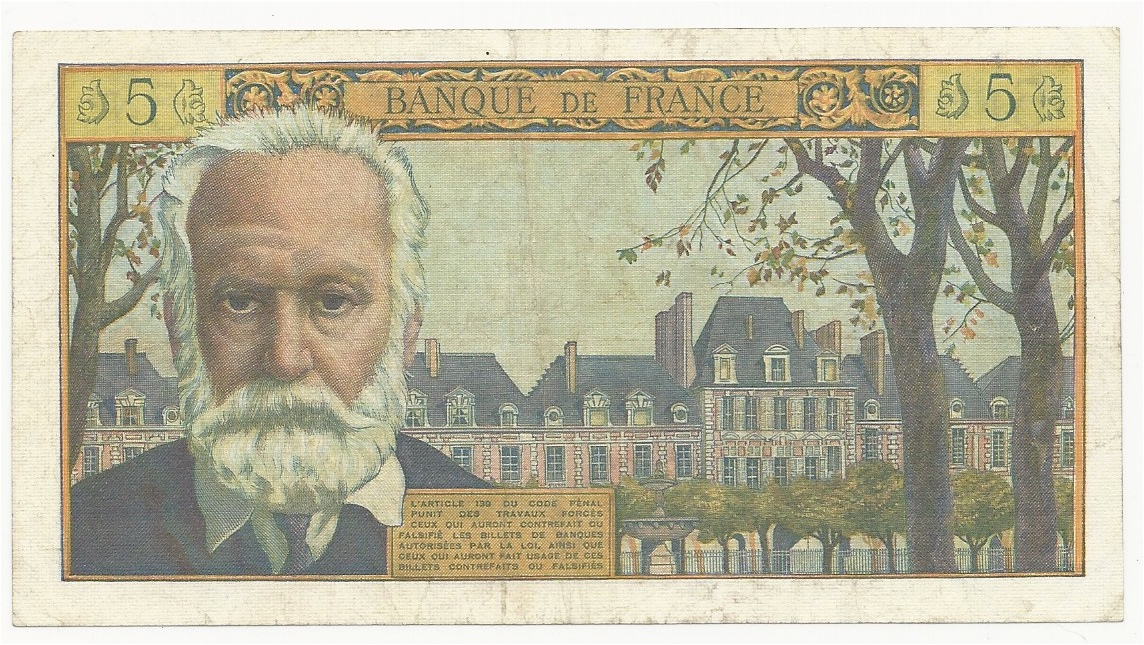
The reverse of a 5 French francs 1959 banknote of the French national bank (Banque de France) with a portrait of Victor Hugo. To the right is an image of the Place des Vosges.

The Place Royale was inaugurated in 1612 with a grand carrousel to celebrate the engagement of Louis XIII and Anne of Austria, and became a prototype of the residential squares of European cities that were to come. What was new about the Place Royale, was that the house-fronts were all built to the same design, probably by Jean Baptiste Androuet du Cerceau, of red brick with strips of stone quoins over vaulted arcades that stand on square pillars. The steeply pitched blue slate roofs are pierced with discreet small-paned dormers above the pedimented dormers that stand upon the cornices. Only the north range was built with the vaulted ceilings that the "galleries" were meant to have.

There are two pavilions that rise higher than the unified roofline of the square on the north and south faces and offer access to the square through triple arches. Though they are designated the Pavilion of the King and of the Queen, no royal has ever lived in the aristocratic square, except for Anne of Austria who lived in the Pavilion de la Reine for a short while. The Place Royale inspired subsequent developments of Paris that created a suitable urban background for the French aristocracy and nobility.

The square was often the place for the nobility to chat, and served as a meeting place for them. This was so until the French Revolution.

Before the square was completed, Henri IV ordered the Place Dauphine to be laid out. Within a mere five-year period, the king oversaw an unmatched building scheme for the ravaged medieval city: additions to the Louvre Palace, the Pont Neuf, and the Hôpital Saint Louis as well as the two royal squares.

Cardinal Richelieu had an equestrian bronze of Louis XIII erected in the centre. In the late 18th century, while most of the nobility moved to the Faubourg Saint-Germain district, the square managed to keep some of its aristocratic owners until the Revolution. It was briefly renamed "Place de la Fabrication-des-Armes" (the place were weapons are produced) then in 1800, it was formally renamed to Place des Vosges in honor of the département of Vosges which was the first to pay taxes supporting a campaign of the Revolutionary army. From 1814 until 1830, and from 1852 until 1870, the name was changed back to the original by the Restoration monarchs. In 1830 the name was briefly switched to being "Place de la République". Finally in 1870 the revolutionary name was restored.

Today the square is planted with a bosquet of mature lindens set in grass and gravel, surrounded by clipped lindens.

- No. 1: Pavillon du Roi
- No. 1bis: Hôtel Coulanges
- No. 3: Hôtel de Montmorin
- No. 5: Hôtel de la Salle
- No. 7: Hôtel de Sully
- No. 9: Hôtel de Chaulnes
- No. 11: Hôtel Pierrard
- No. 13: Hôtel Dyel des Hameaux
- No. 15: Hôtel Marchand
- No. 17: Hôtel de Chabannes
- No. 19: Hôtel de Montbrun
- No. 21: Hôtel du Cardinal de Richelieu
- No. 23: Hôtel de Bassompierre
- No. 25: Hôtel de l'Escalopier

- No. 2bis: Hôtel du 2bis place des Vosges
- No. 2: Hôtel Genou de Guiberville
- No. 4: Hôtel du 4 place des Vosges
- No. 6: Hôtel de Rohan-Guémené
- No. 6bis: Lycée professionnel Théophile Gautier
- No. 8: Hôtel de Fourcy
- No. 10: Hôtel de Châtillon
- No. 12: Hôtel Lafont
- No. 14: Hôtel de Ribault
- No. 16: Hôtel d'Asfeldt
- No. 18: Hôtel de Clermont-Tonnerre
- No. 20: Hôtel d'Angennes de Rambouillet
- No. 22: Hôtel Laffemas
- No. 24: Hôtel de Vitry
- No. 26: Hôtel de Tresmes
- No. 28: Pavillon de la Reine and Hôtel d'Espinoy

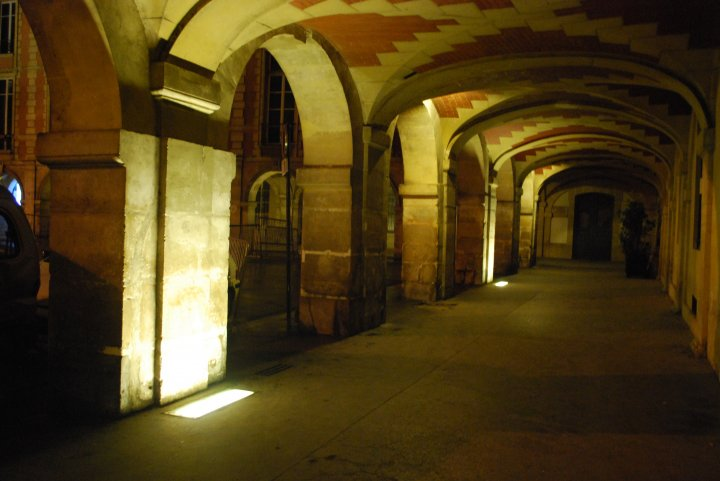
View of no. 6 at night

Residents of the Place des Vosges

- No. 1bis: Madame de Sevigné was born here
- No. 6 (Maison de Victor Hugo): Victor Hugo's home from 1832 to 1848, in what was then the Hôtel de Rohan, now a museum devoted to his memory, managed by the City of Paris
- No. 7: Sully, Henri IV's great minister
- No. 8: poet Théophile Gautier and writer Alphonse Daudet
- No. 9 (Hôtel de Chaulnes): seat of l'Académie d'Architecture, currently also tenanted by Galerie Historisimus
- No. 11: courtesan Marion Delorme from 1639 to 1648
- No. 12: natural philosopher and mathematician Émilie du Châtelet
- No. 14 (Hôtel de la Rivière): rabbi David Feuerwerker, Antoinette Feuerwerker and Atara Marmor
- No. 15: Marguerite Louise d'Orléans, wife of Cosimo III de' Medici Grand Duke of Tuscany. Its ceilings painted by Lebrun are reinstalled in the Musée Carnavalet.
- No. 17: bishop and theologian Bossuet
- No. 20: Prince Obolensky Arnaud Henry Salas-Perez
- No. 21: Cardinal Richelieu from 1615 to 1627
- No. 23: Post-Impressionist painter Georges Dufrénoy
- No. 28 (Pavillon de la Reine): Chabot-Rohan family
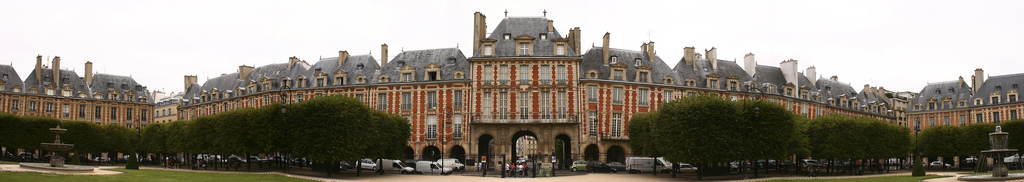
Panoramic view
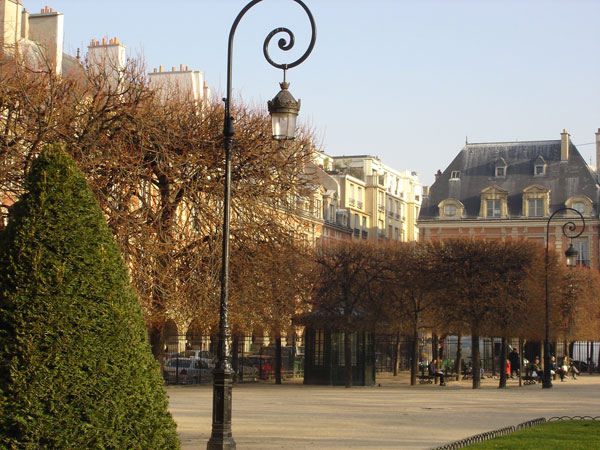
General overview

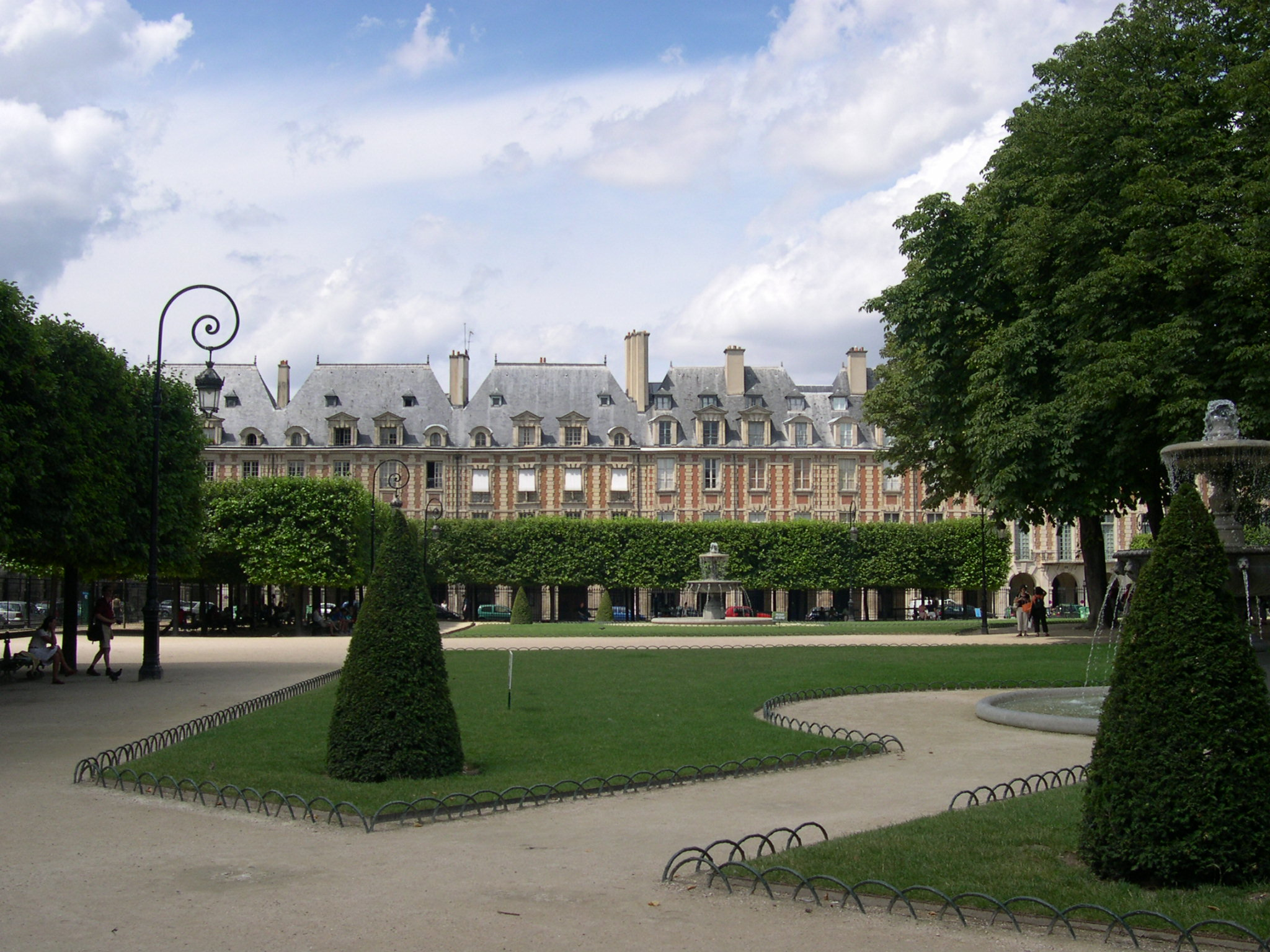
West side

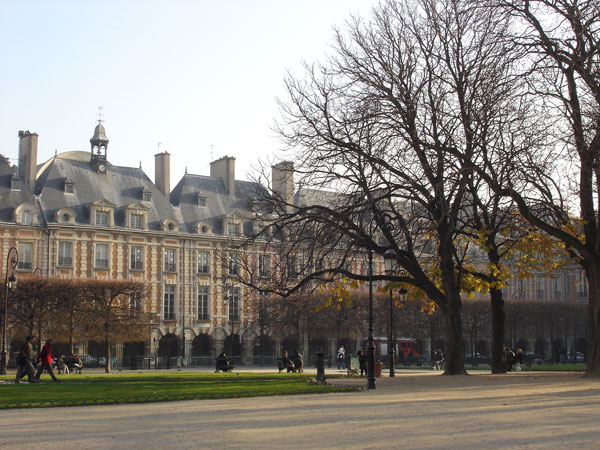
North-east side

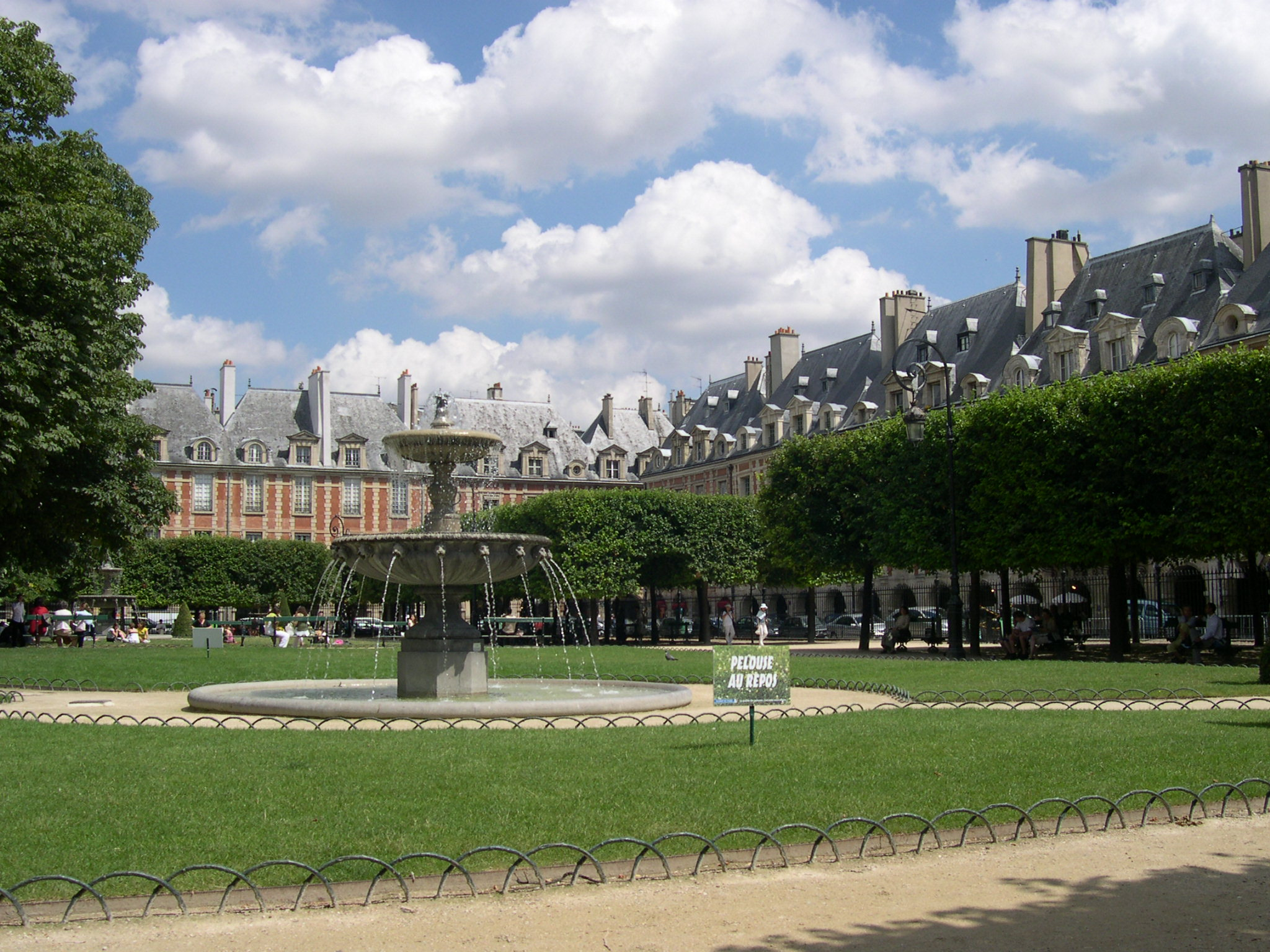
North-east side

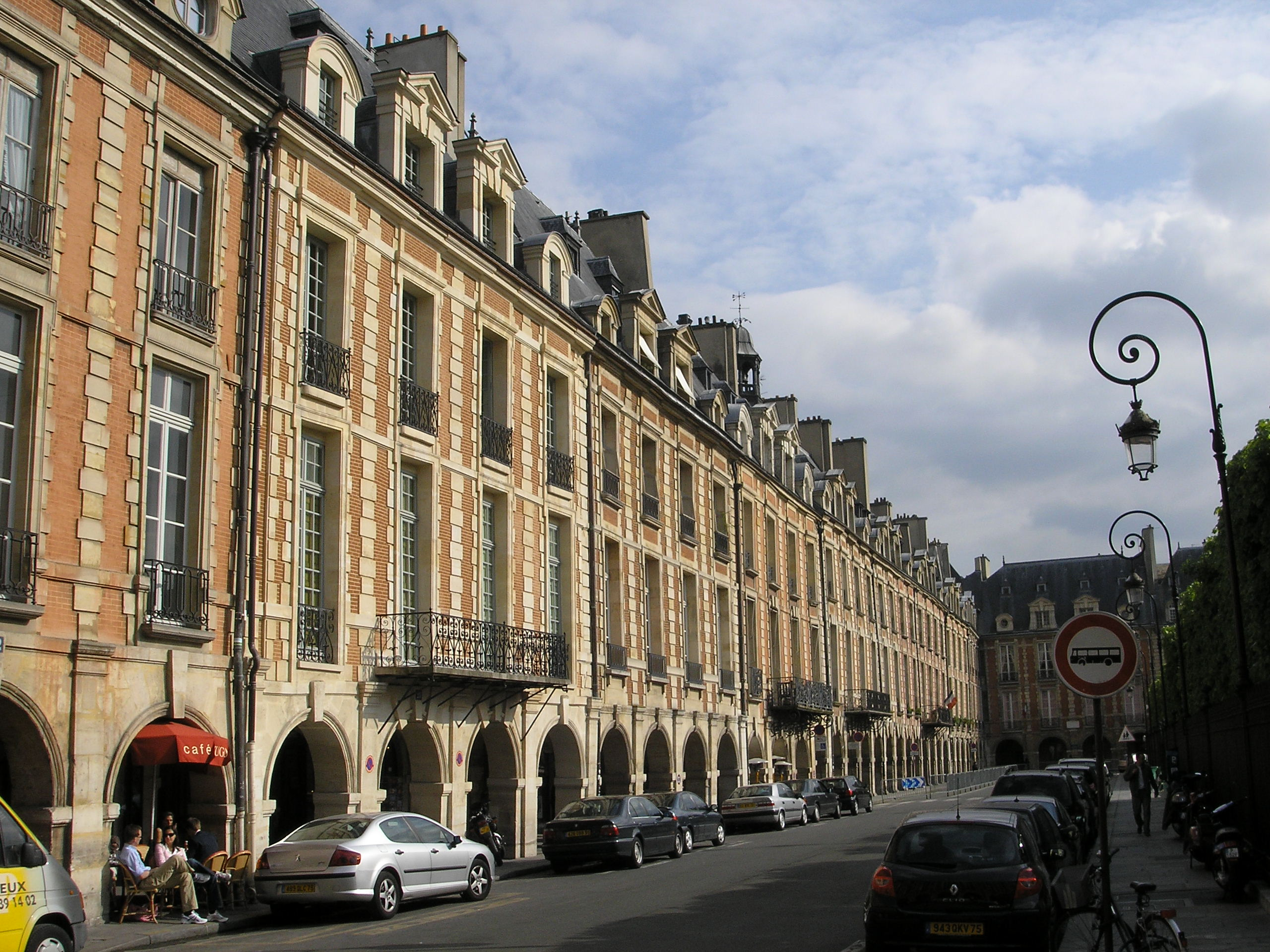
East side

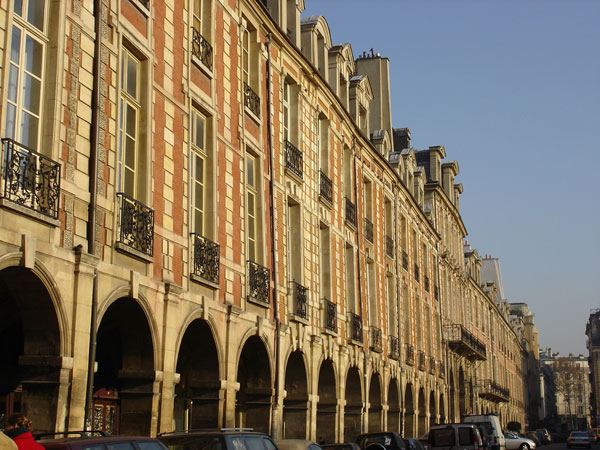
Arcades, east side

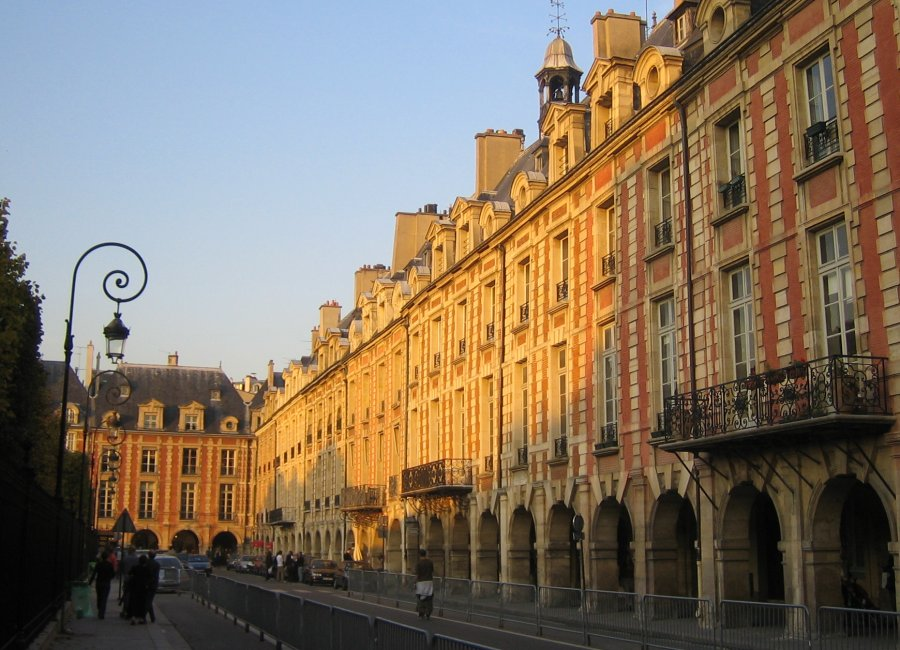
Sunset, east side

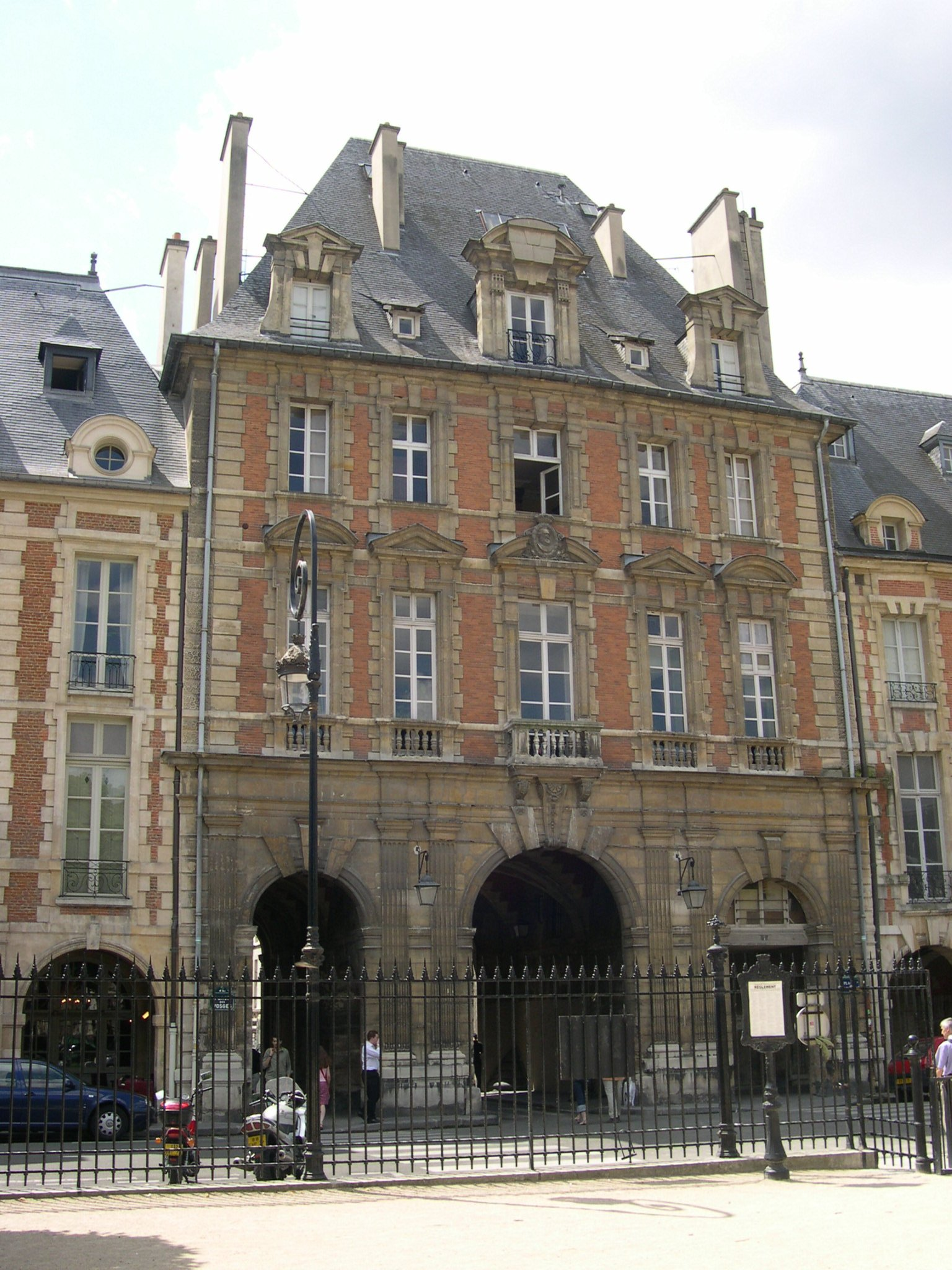
Pavillon du Roi, south side

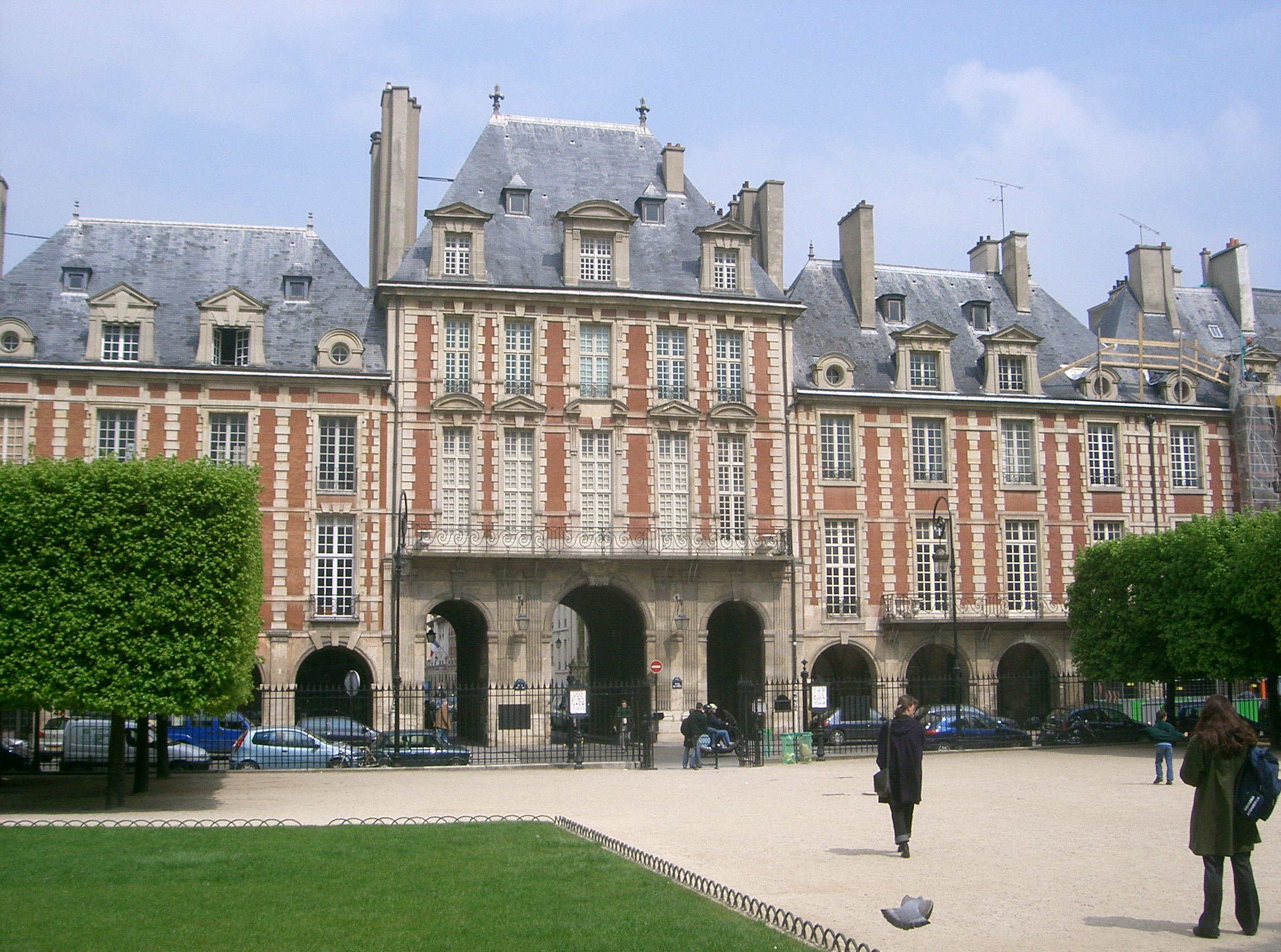
Pavillon de la Reine, north side

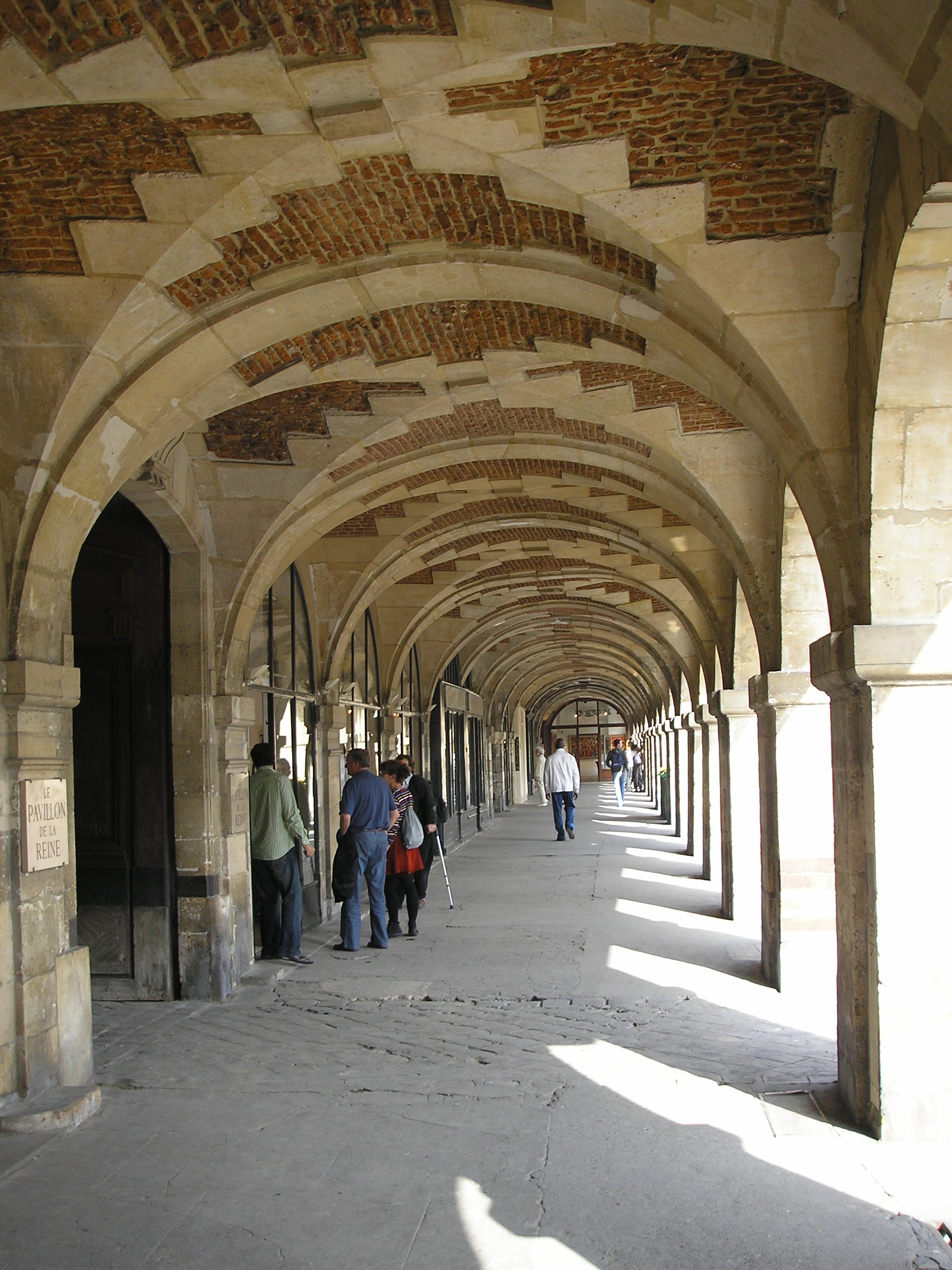
Arcades

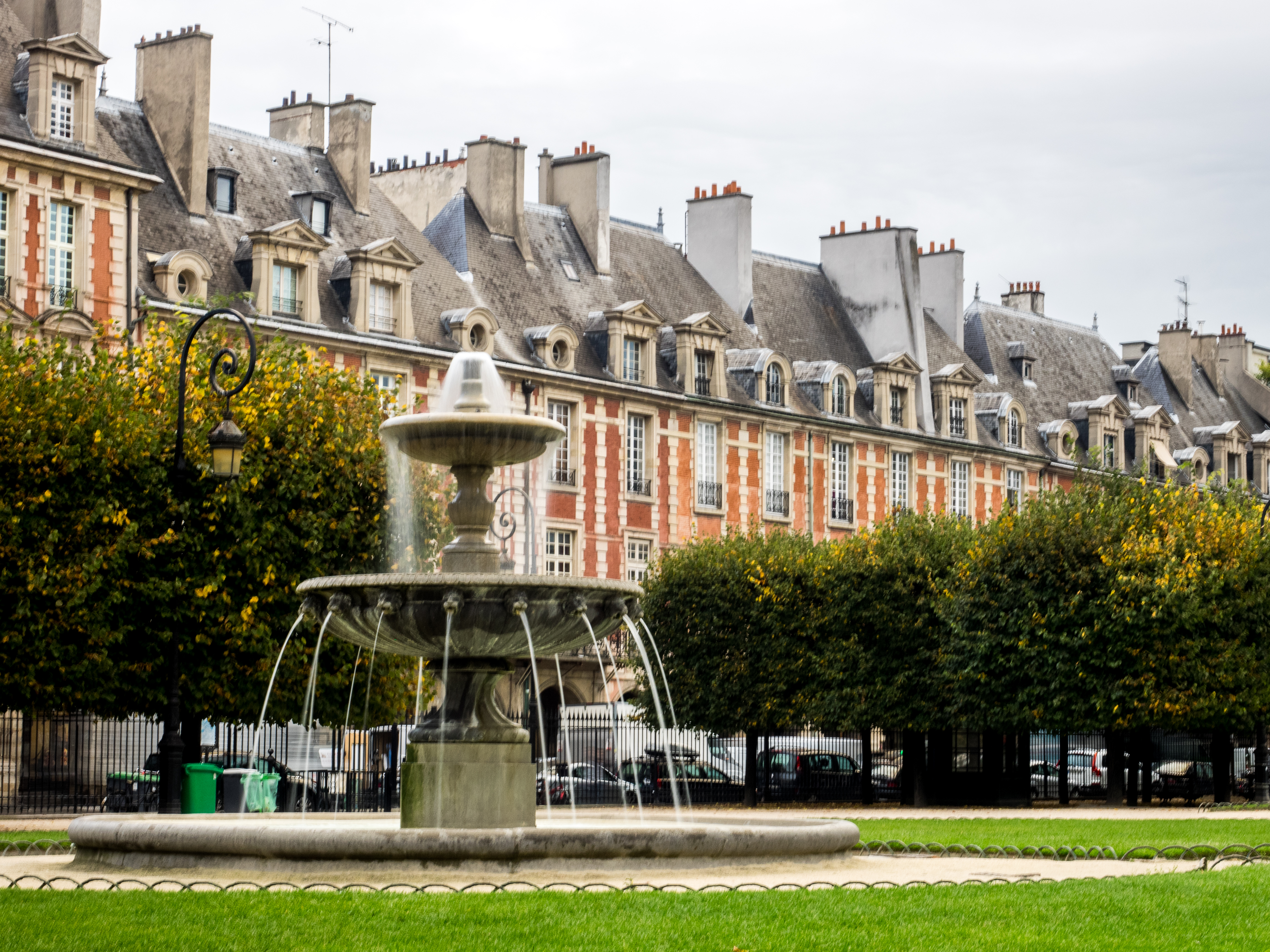
One of Cortot's four fountains (1825)

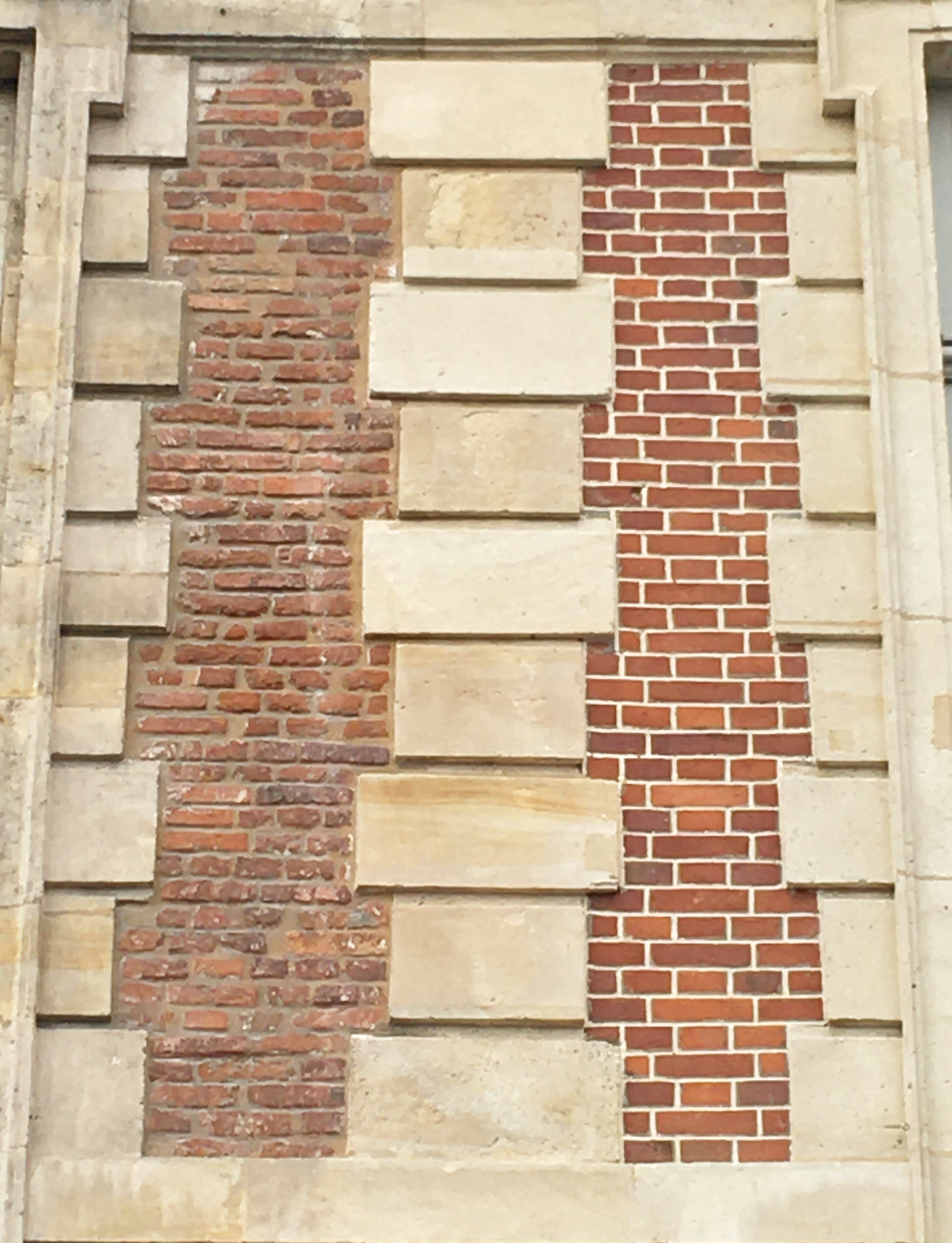
Real brick and fake brick stand side by side

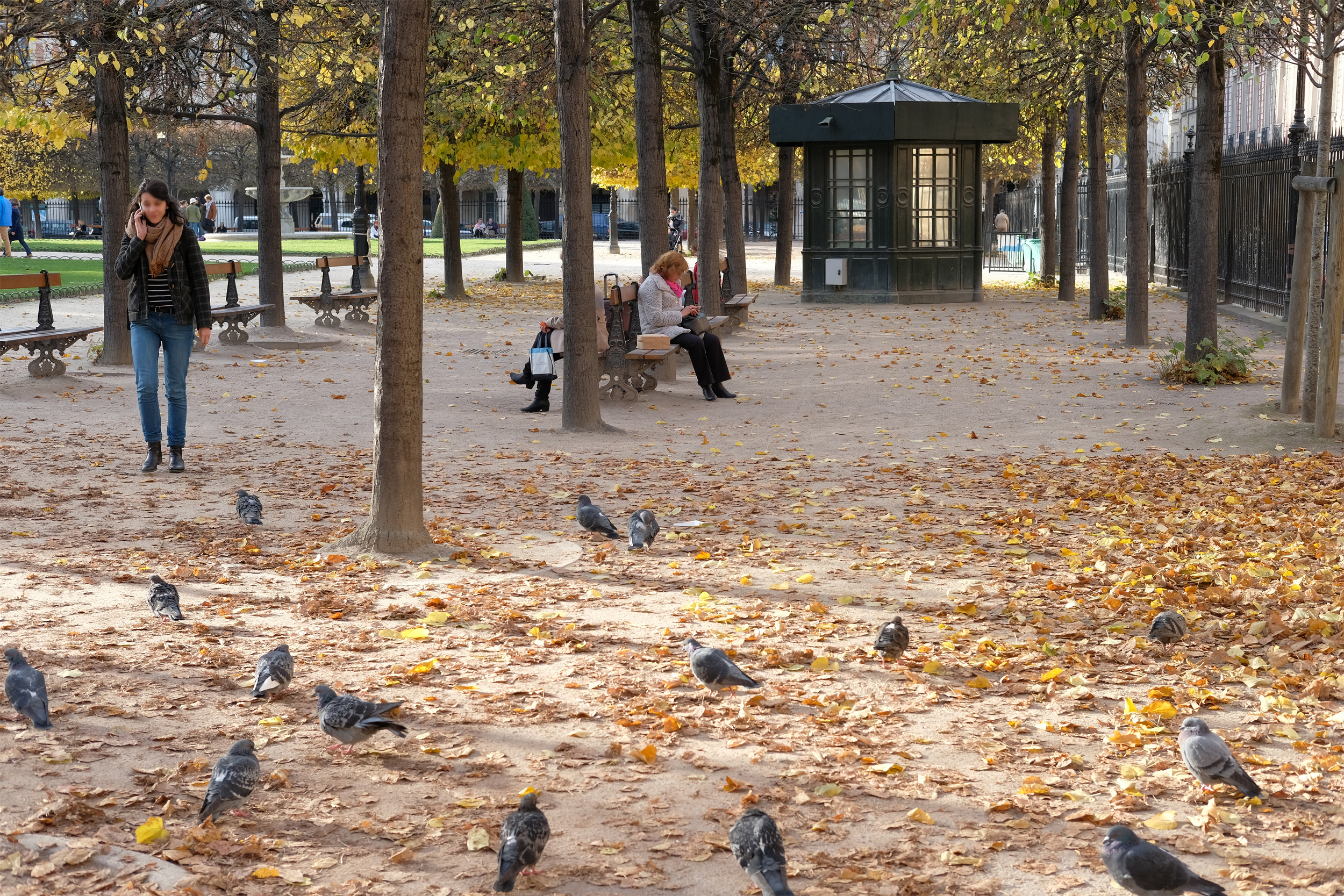
The garden

== See also ==
- Marywil
- List of tourist attractions in Paris
