= Donna F. Ryan =

American historian of Vichy France (1948–2012)

- Born: 1948
- Died: 16 July 2012 (aged 63–64)
- Known for: Historian of France

Donna F. Ryan (1948 – 16 July 2012) was an American historian of Vichy France. Her notable works include a study of Jewish people in Marseille during the Holocaust, and a co-edited volume on deaf people living in Europe between 1933 and 1945. Through her work she demonstrated a strong commitment to deaf and disability history.

== Early life ==
Ryan was born in Boston, Massachusetts. She studied at Wheaton College, in Norton, Massachusetts, and completed her PhD at Georgetown University in 1984, specialising in Modern European history and the history of France.

== Career ==
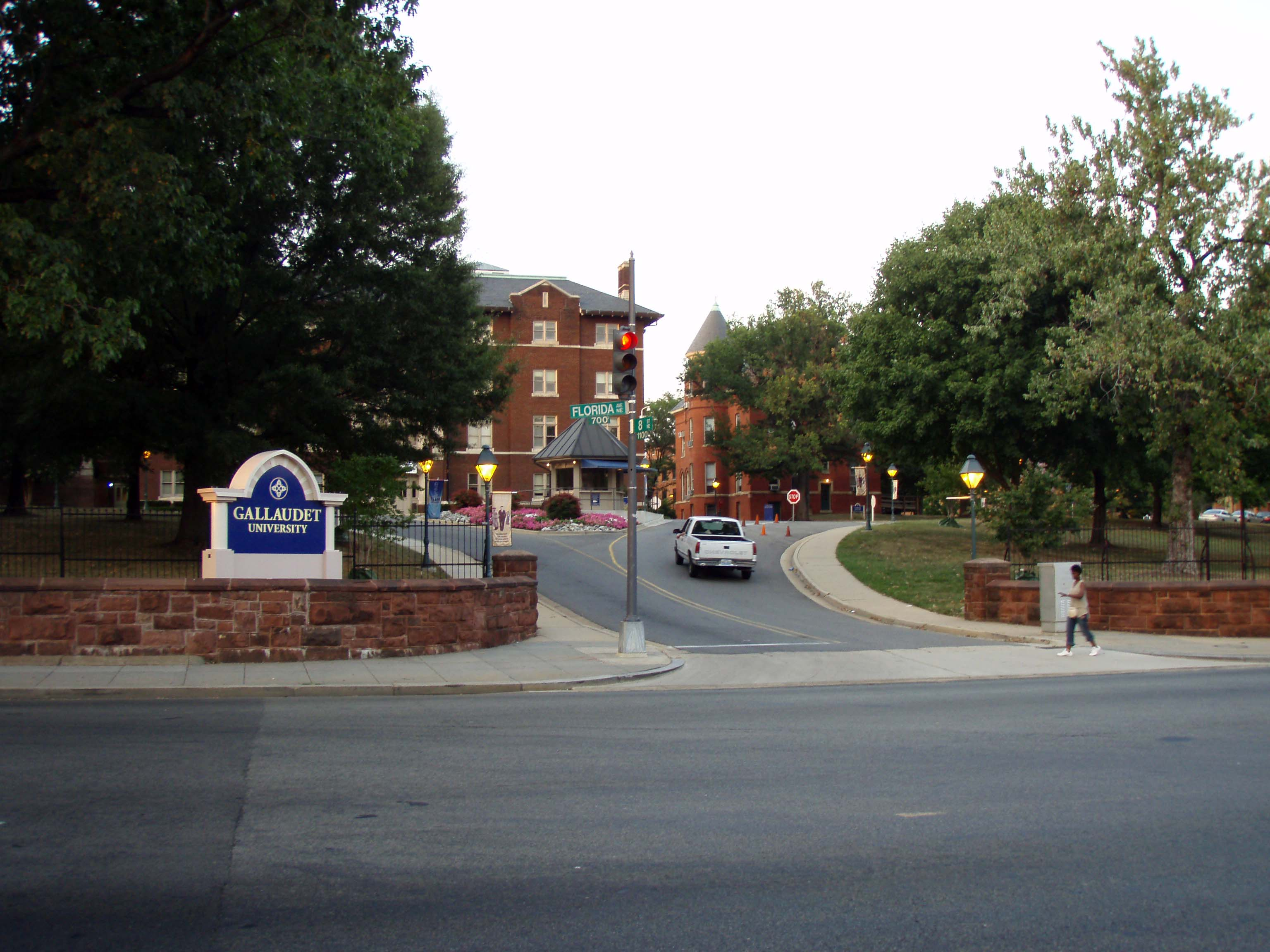
Gallaudet University

In 1984, she joined the History Department at Gallaudet University, where she worked for twenty-eight years, becoming a professor in 1993.

In 1998, together with professor John S. Schuchman, also of Gallaudet University, she organised an international conference on "Deaf People in Hitler’s Europe". A collection of papers from this conference, co-edited by Ryan and Schuchman, was published as Deaf People in Hitler’s Europe by Gallaudet University Press and the United States Holocaust Memorial Museum in 2002.

During her time at Gallaudet University, she helped to develop the Certificate in Deaf History program and to create the Women’s Studies Minor.

She was a long-time member of the Western Society for French History as well as co-editor of the journal Proceedings of the Western Society for French History from 2008 to 2011.

In 2013 a panel session in memory of Donna Ryan was held at the Western Society for French History Conference, in Atlanta, Georgia.

== Selected works ==
- Donna F. Ryan. The Holocaust and the Jews of Marseille: The Enforcement of Anti-Semitic Policies in Vichy France. Urbana: University of Illinois Press, 1996
- Donna F. Ryan and John S. Schuchman eds. Deaf People in Hitler's Europe. Washington D.C.: Gallaudet University Press, 2002.
