= Fort du Mont Verdun =

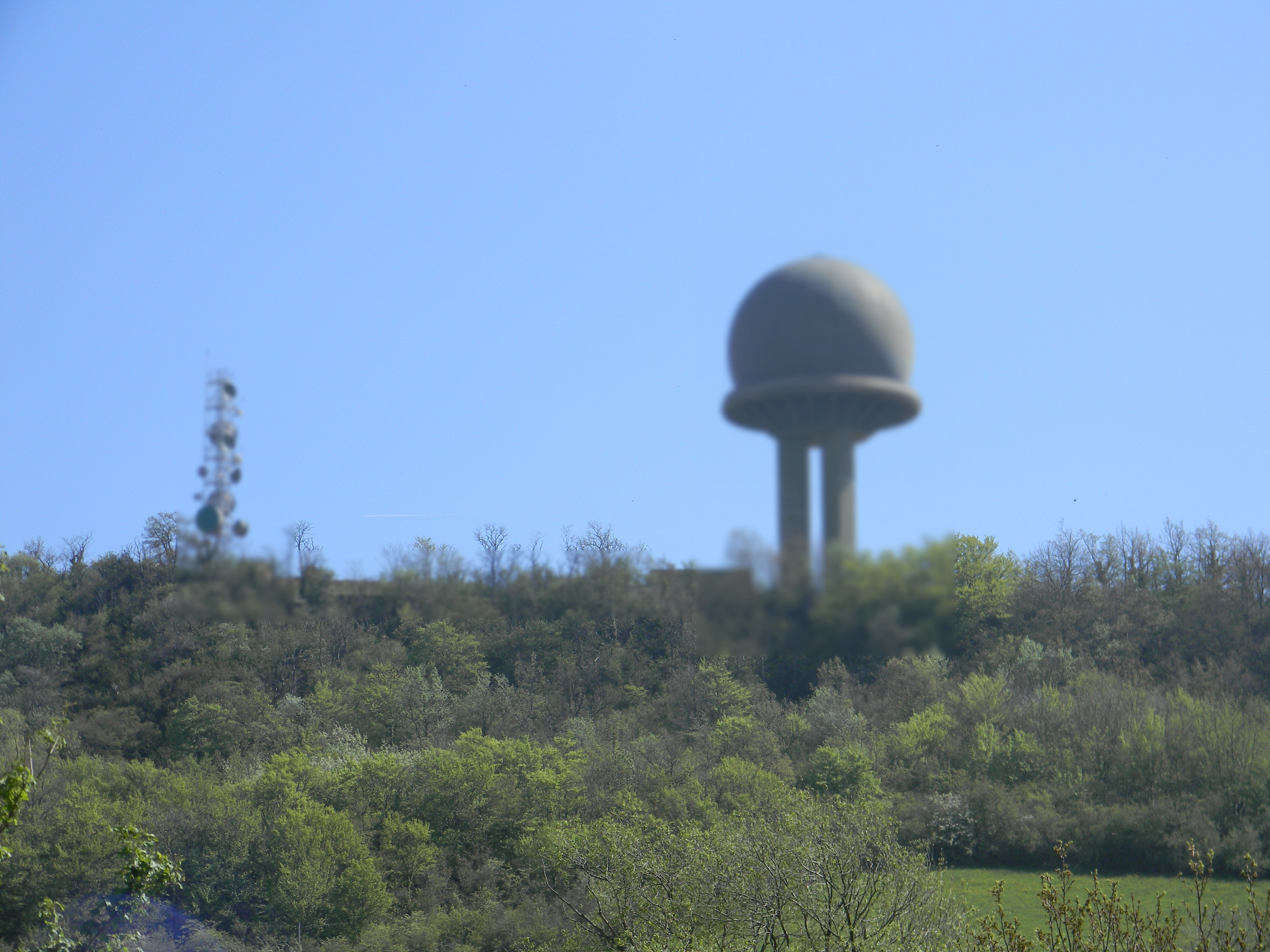
- The military radome at the summit of the fort.

Location
- Coordinates: 45.849178°N 4.779497°E

Site history
- Built: 1874

Fort Mont Verdun is the biggest highlight of the second belt of Forts around Lyon and is the only one considered to be a mountain fort. It rests at 630 meters altitude, dominating Lyon, Limonest, the lower Azergues valley and the Saône valley. It was covered by a low battery and four other associated batteries: Mont Thou, Les Carrières, Narcel and La Freta. It is now occupied by the Airbase 942 Lyon-Mont Verdun.

This belt of forts included the forts of Bron, Vancia, Fort de Feyzin and Fort du Mont Verdun itself.

== History ==
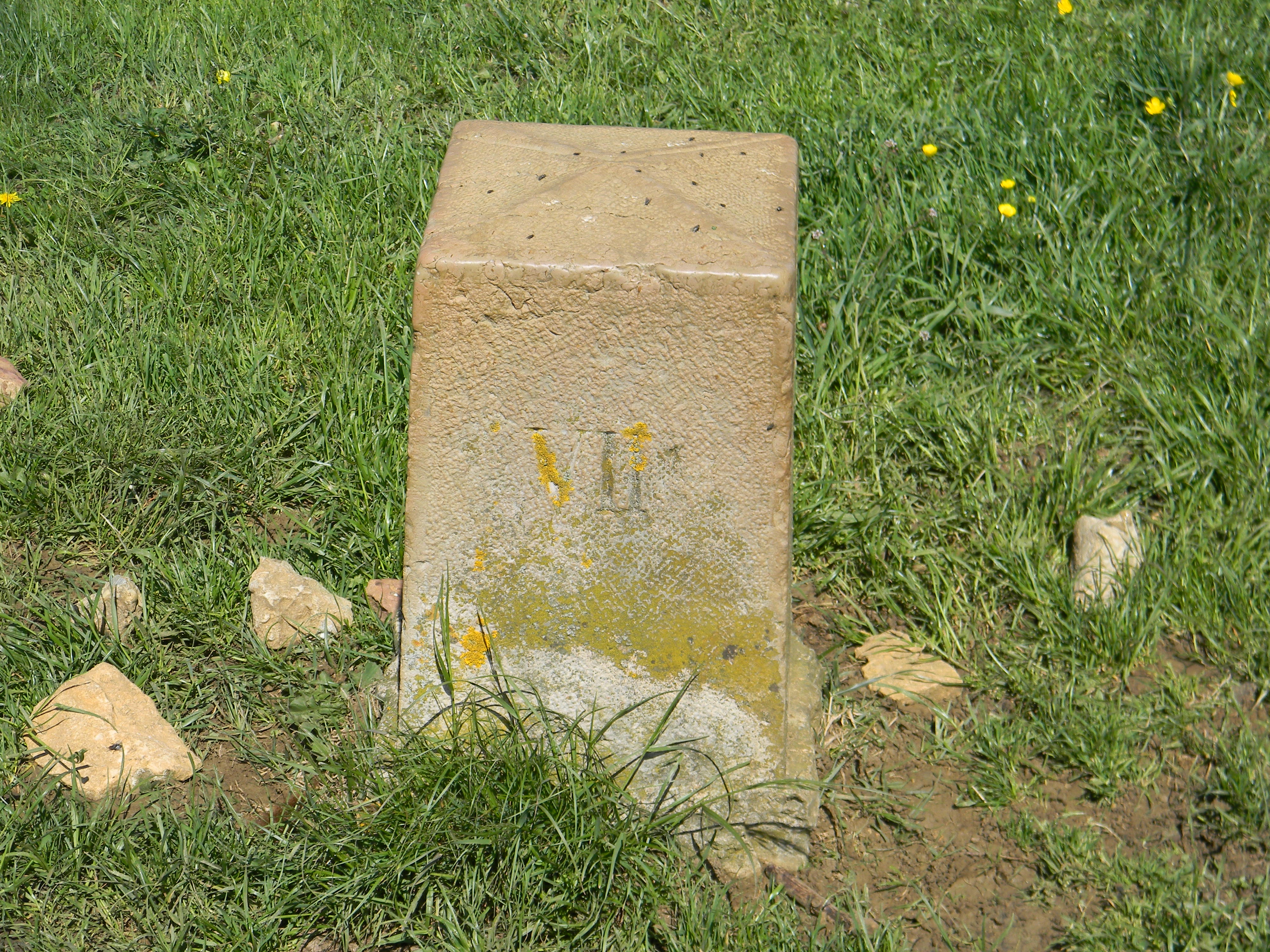
Service Stone VII of the fort.

Work began in 1874 and the barracks were strengthened in 1886 by special concrete.

A pentagon, the fort is surrounded by covered trench caponnières. The entrance to the fort is via a Pont Dormant extended by an overhead crane. A thick pile of earth at its center hides the barracks of two floors which can accommodate 500 men. This slope surface also housed 14 artillery platforms.

Two powder stores, capable of holding 76 and 65 tonnes, provisioned the artillery.

A telegraph was also installed on the fort; it ensured communications with the Fort St. Eynard and that of the Bastille from Grenoble.

The fort is one of the few in the region to have its military service capstones still visible in the surrounding fields.

== Today ==
The fort was declassed in 1889 and was then used as a store and ammunition depot.

In 1943–44, the Fort was used by the Germans for air defense..

After the war, the Air Force installed a radar unit, the Airbase 942 Lyon-Mont Verdun. The radome placed on the fort is visible from Lyon.

== See also ==
- Ceintures de Lyon
