= Fort de Feyzin =

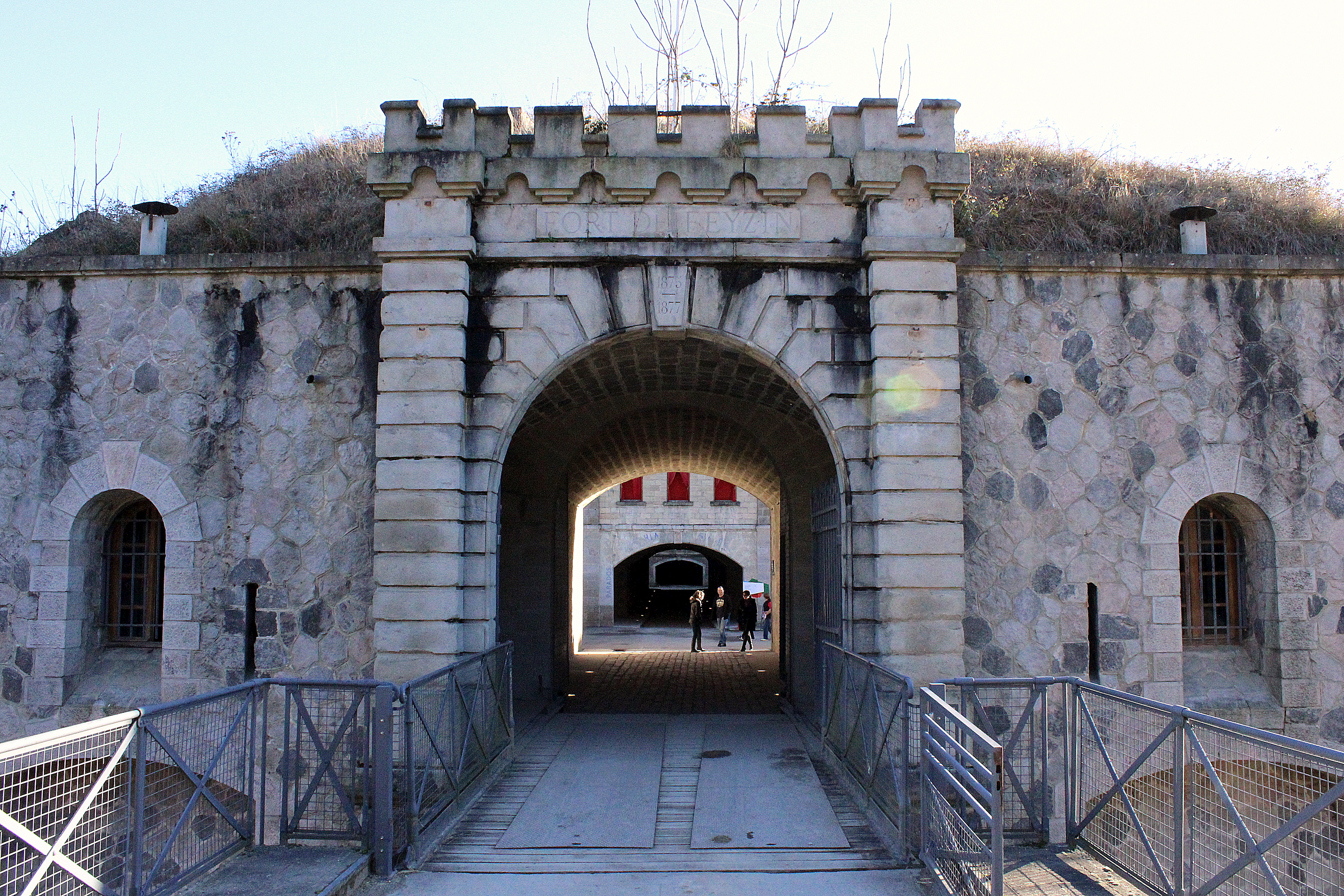
- Pavillon Entrance of fort, view from exterior.

Site information
- Type: Fort

Location
- Location within France
- Coordinates: 45.671644°N 4.8669°E

Site history
- Built: 1875–1877

The Fort Feyzin is a fort built between 1875 and 1877 in Feyzin. It is one of the forts of the second belt of forts around Lyon and more generally the Séré de Rivières fort system. This belt of forts included the forts of Bron, Vancia, Feyzin and Mont Verdun. It currently houses a riding stable managed by the UCPA on behalf of the city of Feyzin.

== Characteristics ==
Located 230 meters above sea level, it covers a wide area: 22 000 square meters built on 26 wooded hectares, located near the center of Feyzin-le-haut and the Trois cerisiers recreational center.

== History ==
The fort was designed to defend Lyon to the south. It also ensured protection of Fort de Champvillard, the RN7, Solaize, Saint-Symphorien-d'Ozon and Fort de Corbas.

Fort Feyzin throughout its history has essentially served as a garrison for the army, and as a gendarmerie. The town became the owner of the fort in July 2003 and now holds tours, of the military road near the caponier, the postern stairs and the ditches, the entrance building and rolling bridge over a ditch, which have been completely renovated as well as a nature walk.

Thanks to the patronage of Foundation Total S.A. the entrance building of the fort has been restored.

== Plan of the Fort ==
on dotted brown lines, underground routes for accessing different following buildings: ravelin (1), barracks (2), simple caponiers (3), double caponier (4), magazines (5), crane (6) and entrance to fort (7).

== The fort today ==
The fort of Feyzin is open to the public at the fort bal(l)ade (a one-day event in early summer, held since 2006) and for European Heritage Days.

The fort is the subject of a development program with the creation of a leisure center oriented toward installing an equestrian center, activities like archery and orienteering, the renovation of new facilities and the development of training facilities (fire, police, humanitarian associations ...).

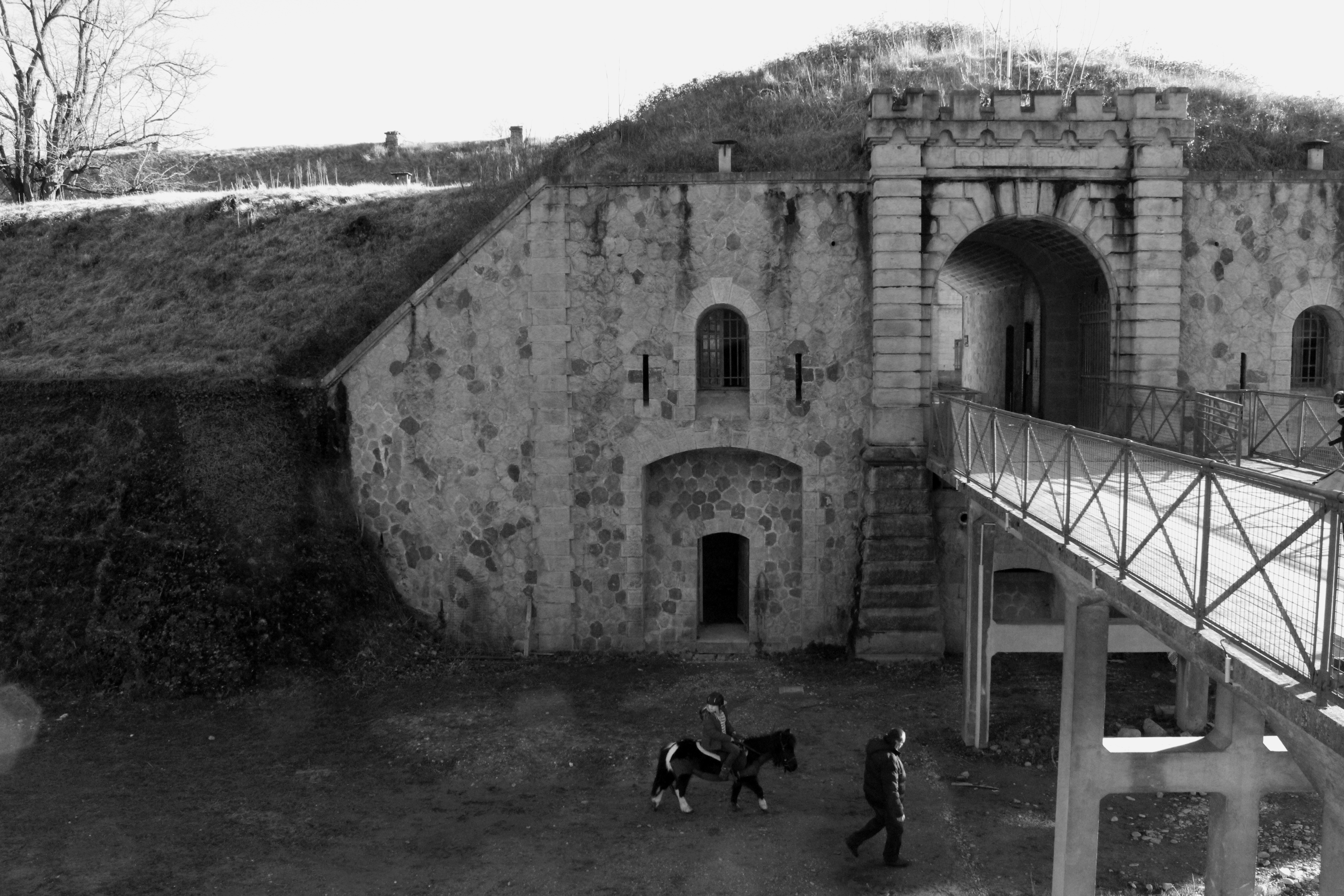
A pony path in the ditch of the fort.

After the renovation of the entrance pavilion in 2008, the equestrian center opened its doors on 27 July 2013. The old stables used by the army were rehabilitated to accommodate from 20 to 30 ponies; a covered carousel and an open air tiltyard are also present. This equipment is managed and run by the UCPA on behalf of the town of Feyzin. The Bioforce Institute also uses the fort for its training.

== See also ==
- Ceintures de Lyon

== Bibliography ==
- Dallemagne, François (2006), Éditions Lyonnaises d'Art et d'Histoire (ed.), Les défenses de Lyon: enceintes et fortifications, Georges Fessy(photographer), Lyon, pp. 175–183, ISBN 2-84147-177-2
