= Francheville, Metropolis of Lyon =

Francheville
- Commune
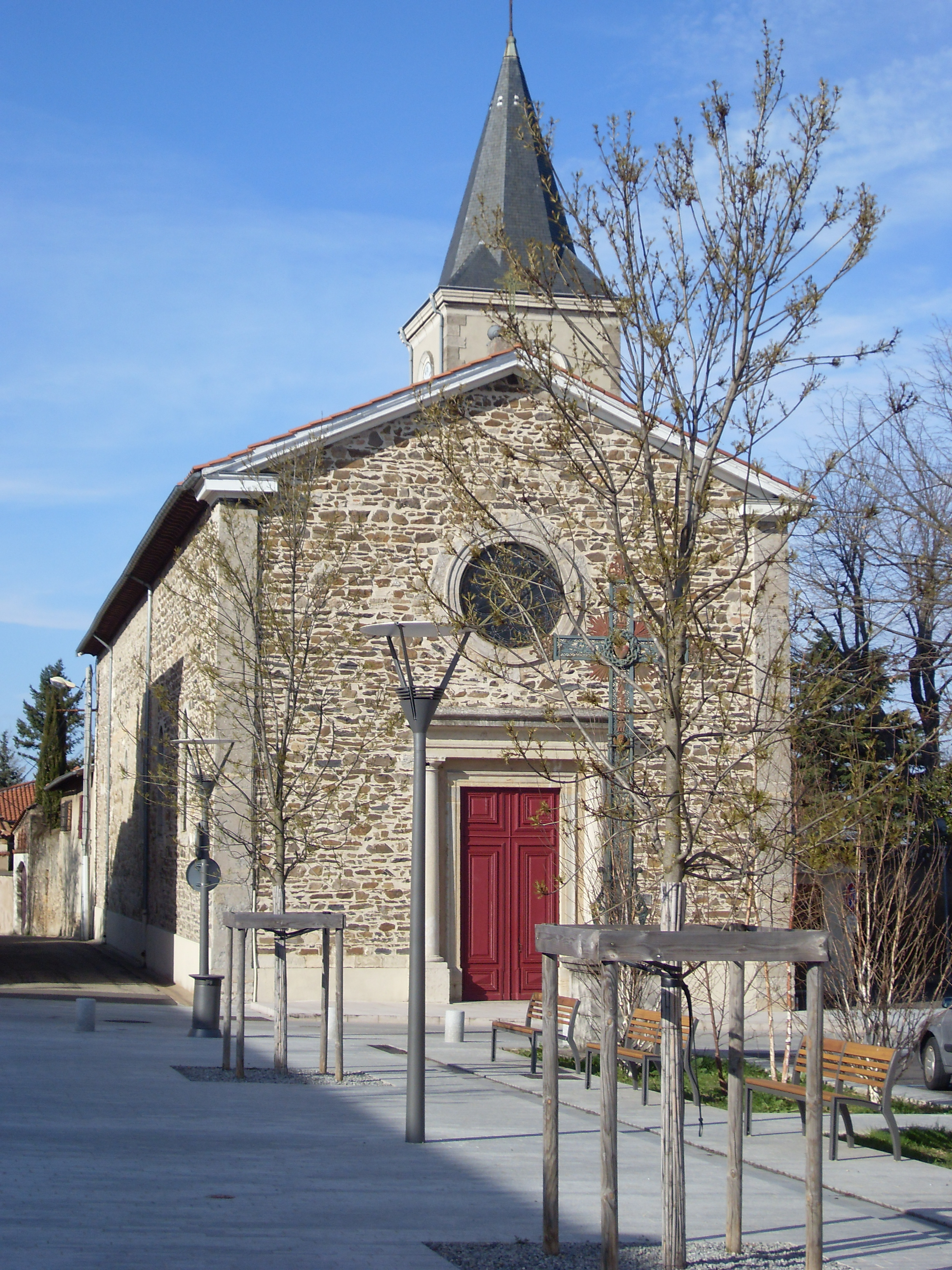
- The church of Saint-Roch

- Coat of arms
- Location of Francheville
- Location within France Location within Auvergne-Rhône-Alpes
- Coordinates: 45°44′14″N 4°45′51″E
- Country: France
- Region: Auvergne-Rhône-Alpes
- Metropolis: Lyon Metropolis
- Arrondissement: Lyon

Government
  - Mayor (2020–2026): Michel Rantonnet
- Area^{1}: 8.18 km^{2} (3.16 sq mi)
- Elevation: 262 m (860 ft)
- Highest elevation: 312 m (1,024 ft)
- Lowest elevation: 181 m (594 ft)
- Population (2023): 15,604
  - Density: 1,910/km^{2} (4,940/sq mi)
- Time zone: UTC+01:00 (CET)
  - Summer (DST): UTC+02:00 (CEST)
- INSEE/Postal code: 69089 /69340
- ^{1} French Land Register data, which excludes lakes, ponds, glaciers > 1 km^{2} (0.386 sq mi or 247 acres) and river estuaries.

Francheville (French pronunciation: [fʁɑ̃ʃvil]; Arpitan: Franchevéla) is a commune in the Metropolis of Lyon, region of Auvergne-Rhône-Alpes, eastern France.

== Geography ==
Francheville is a western suburb of Lyon.

=== Surrounding communes ===
- In the Metropolis of Lyon:
  - Craponne
  - Lyon
  - Sainte-Foy-lès-Lyon
  - Tassin-la-Demi-Lune
- In the Rhône department:
  - Brindas
  - Chaponost

=== Transport ===
- Several buses from the center of Lyon : Lines 14, 29, 30, C20

== Population ==
Historical population
Year	Pop.	±% p.a.
1968	4,932	—
1975	8,099	+7.34%
1982	9,500	+2.31%
1990	10,863	+1.69%
1999	11,324	+0.46%
2007	11,708	+0.42%
2012	13,599	+3.04%
2017	14,198	+0.87%
2023	15,604	+1.59%
Source: INSEE

== City partnerships ==
- Hanau, Germany
- Loano, Italy

== Sites of interest ==
- Château de Francheville, listed as a monument historique.
- Fort du Bruissin, an old military fort
