= Fort de Montessuy =

- Part of first belt of Lyon
- Caluire-et-Cuire; Near Caluire-et-Cuire/Greater Lyon/France
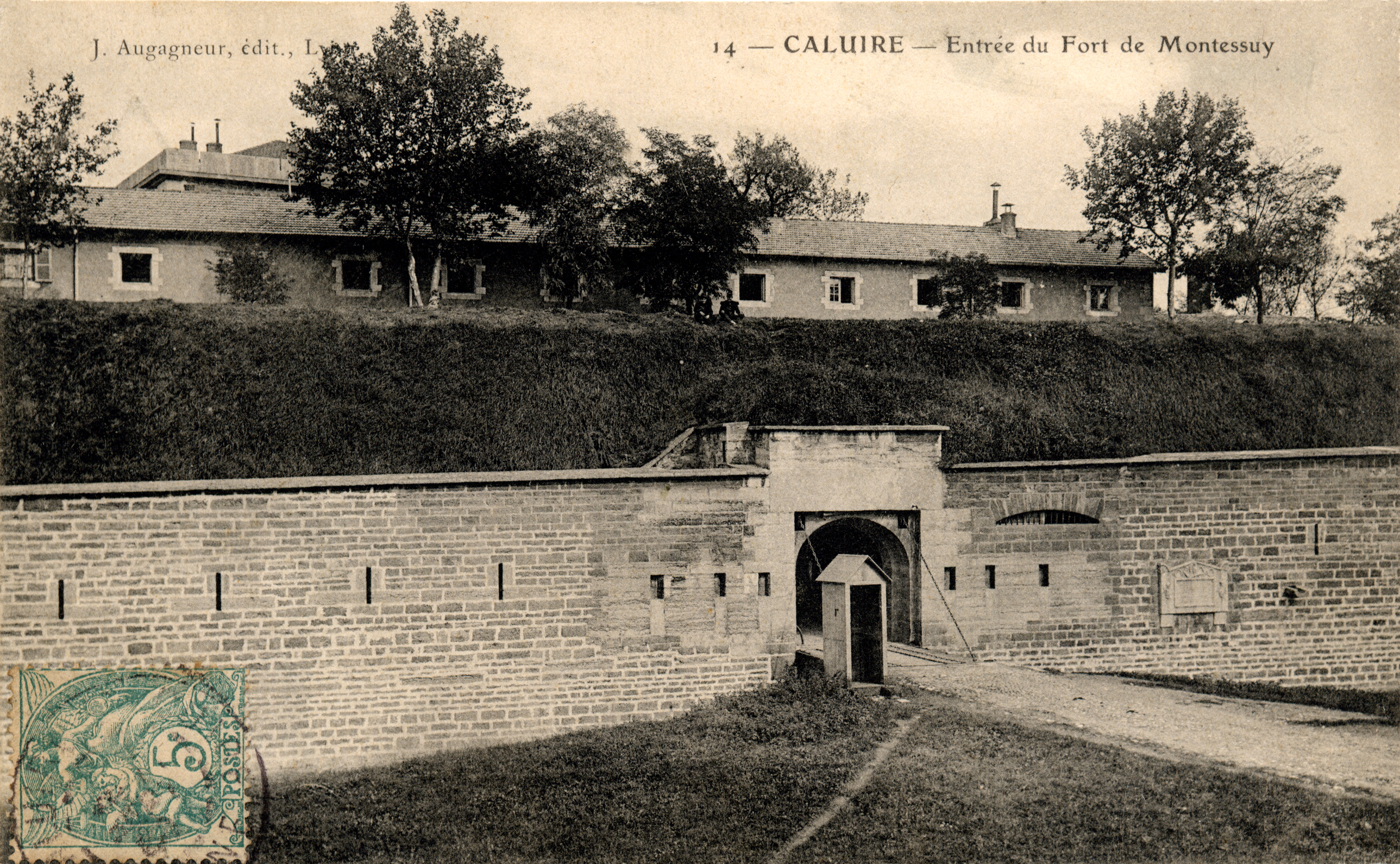
- fort entrance

Site information
- Type: Fort
- Owner: Caluire-et-Cuire
- Controlled by: France

Location
- Coordinates: 45.791886°N 4.847544°E

Site history
- Built: 1831
- Architect: Hubert Rohault de Fleury

The Fort de Montessuy is a fort in the first belt of fortifications in Lyon, located in the neighborhood of Montessuy in Caluire-et-Cuire, Rhône, France.

== History ==
Built in 1831, it was linked to Fort de Caluire, its less imposing twin, by an enclosure aligned with île Barbe, protecting Lyon and particularly Croix-Rousse from invaders coming up the road from the Dombes.

From the north bank of the Rhône, it defended the river and the Fort des Brotteaux.

North was considered dangerous, so a large ravelin was built before the fort in this direction, as well as a lunette further out.

When the Germans were leaving Caluire-et-Cuire on 24 August 1944, two children, Jean Turba (1930 - 1944) and Bernadette Choux (1931 - 1944) watched their departure through field-glasses from the fort de Montessuy; soldiers still posted across the Rhône fired on them with machine guns, killing them both. A street in Montessuy was named after the children (allée Turba-et-Choux). On the wall of the école d'Application Jean-Jaurès de Caluire (a public grade school on the place Jules-Ferry opened on October 1, 1933), a plaque commemorates Jean Turba and two 1944 other victims of the Nazis, also former students at the school.

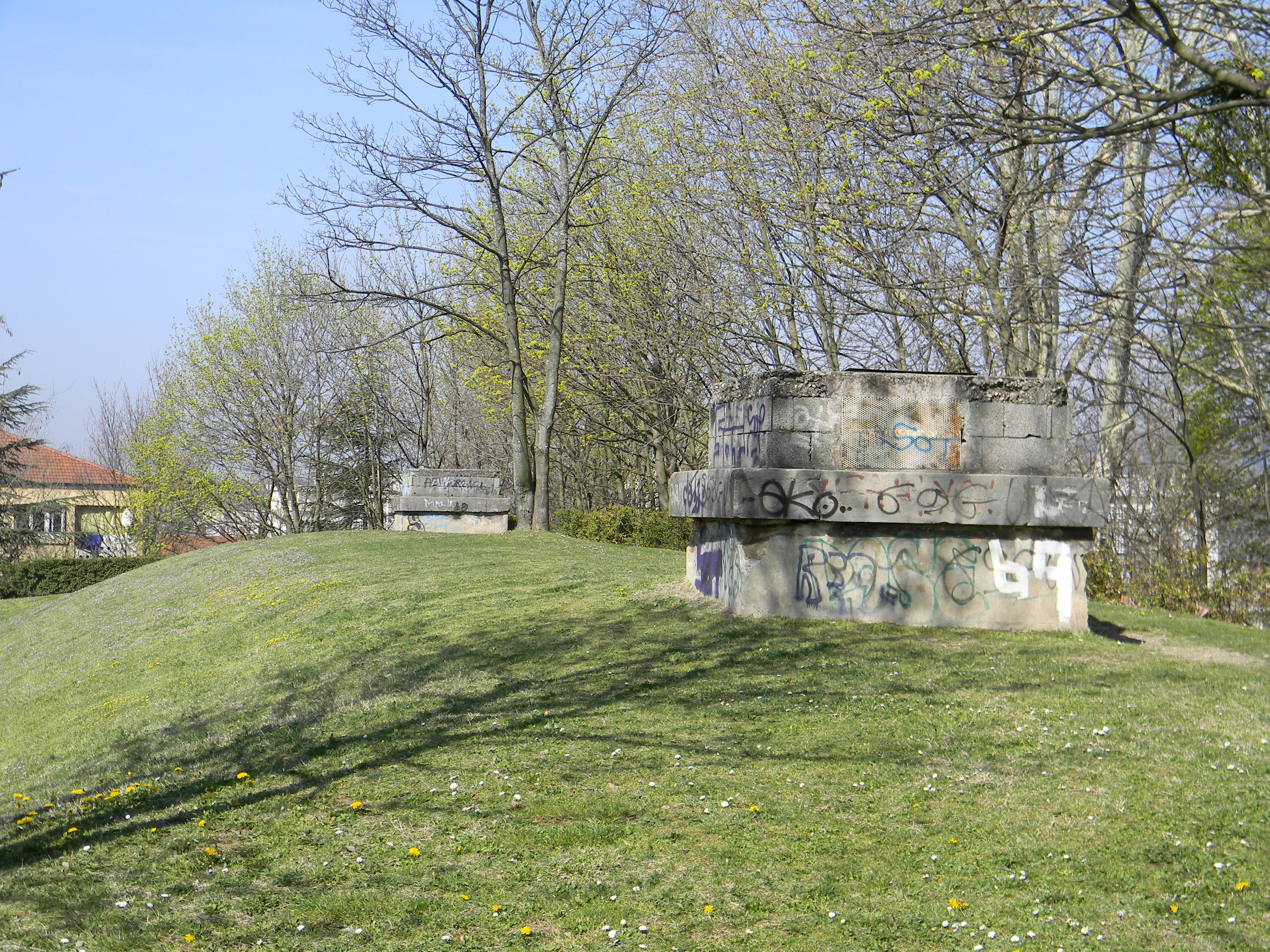
Scarp tops

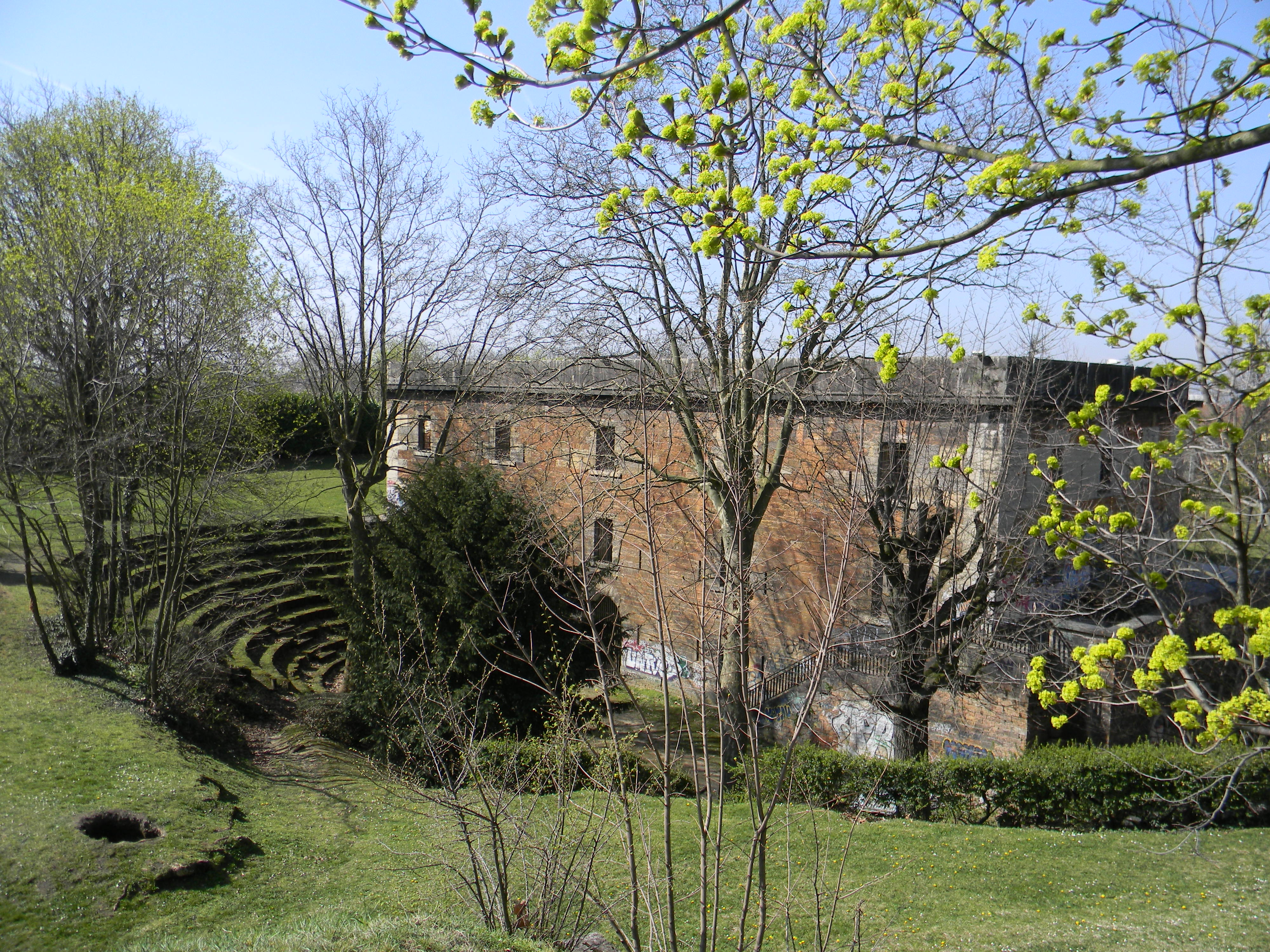
Barracks

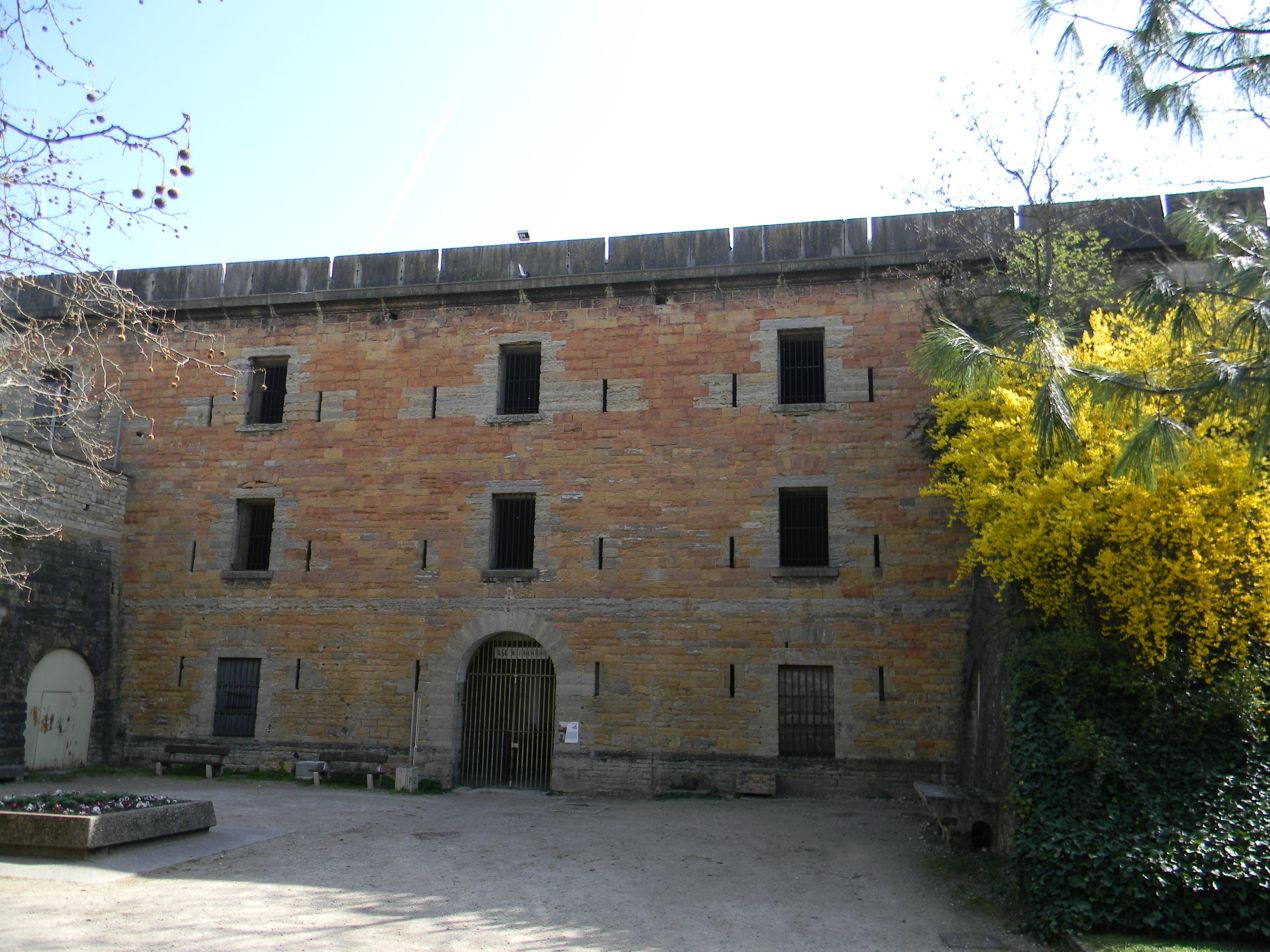

== Current use ==
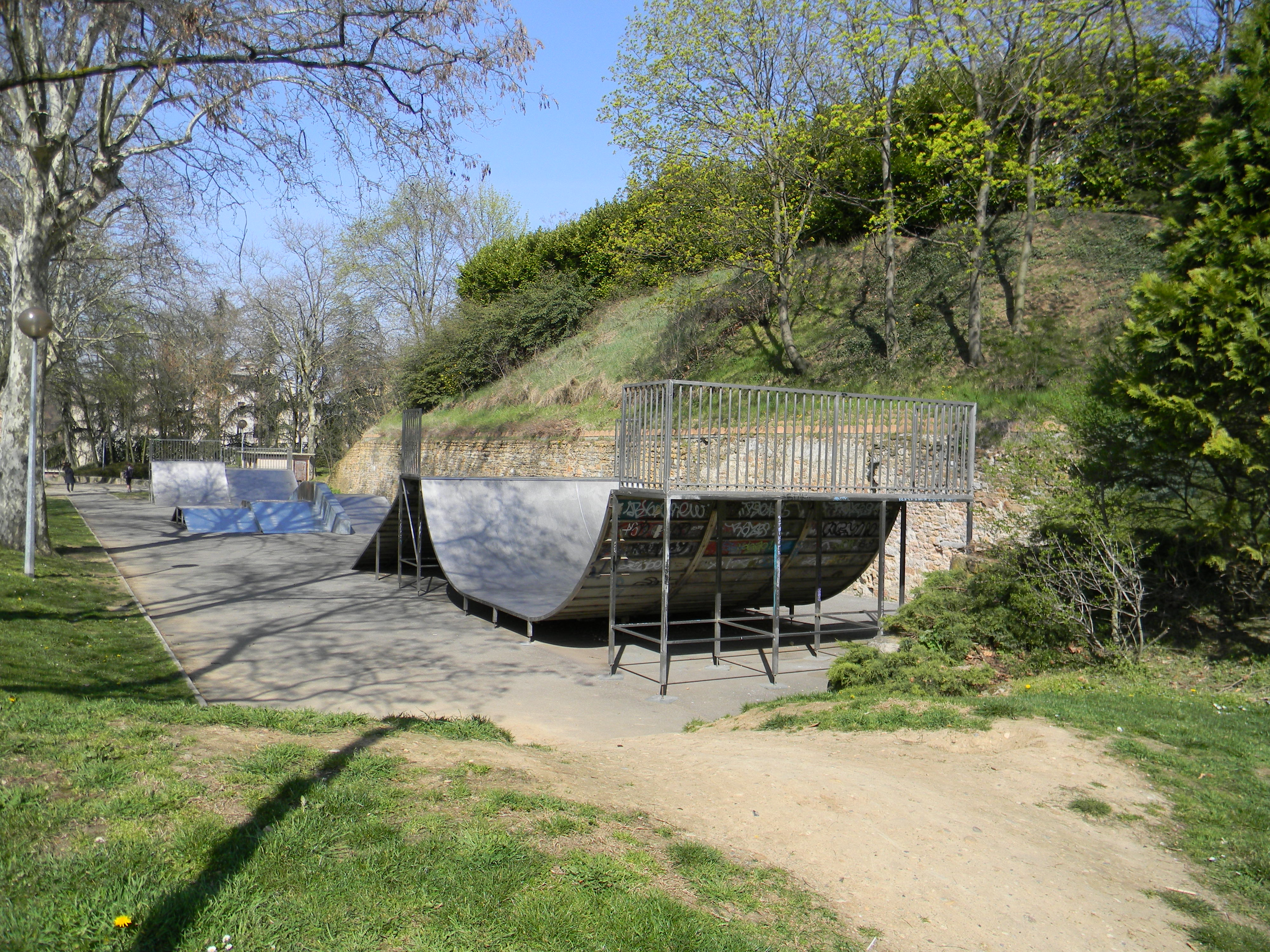
Skatepark near the fort.

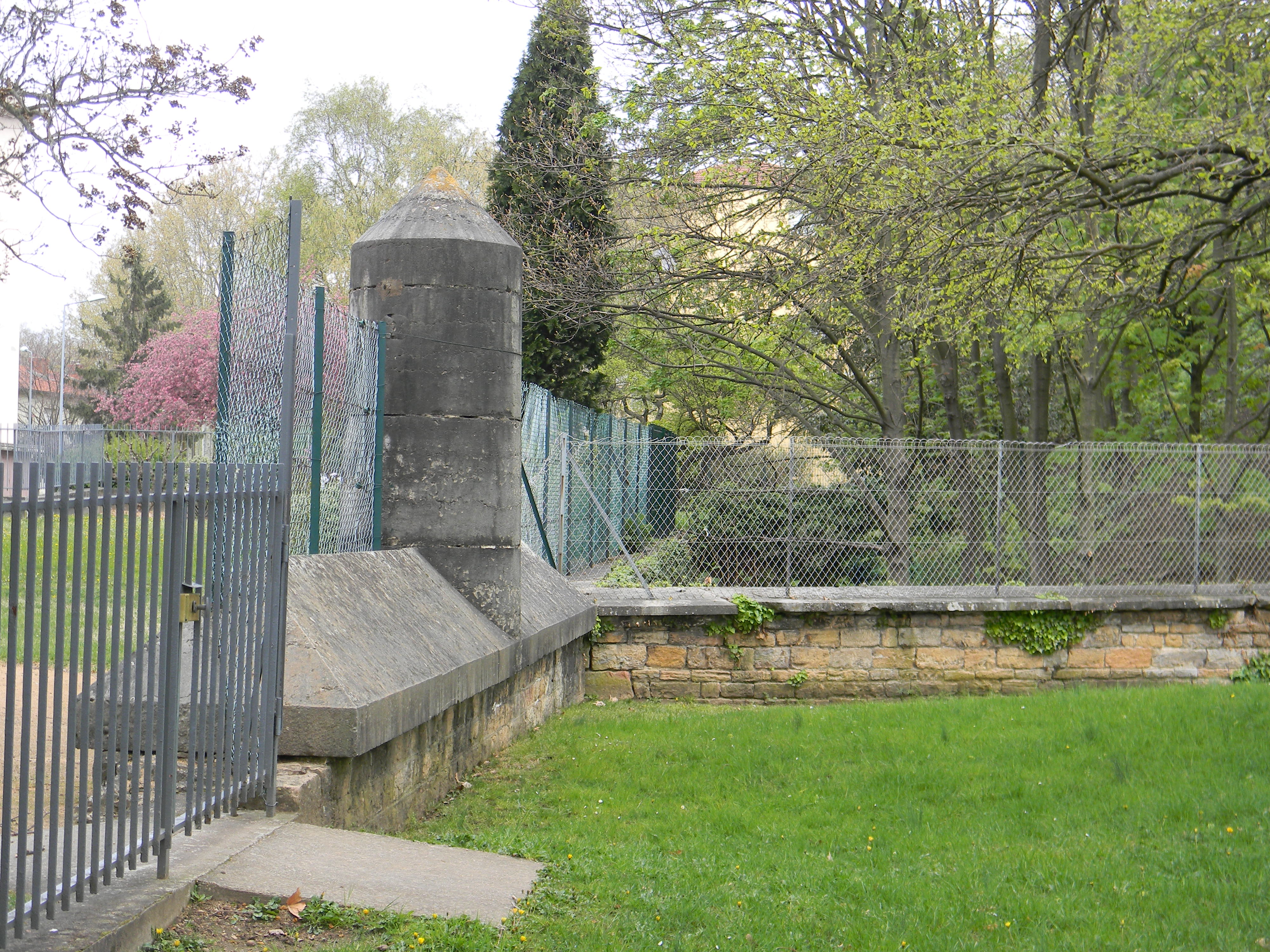
Une « dame » sur un reste d'escarpe.

The fort still exists in Caluire-et-Cuire, dans le quartier Montessuy, and has been owned by the municipality since 1972. Its moats have been covered over by fill dirt from the excavations for the construction of the new buildings now at the heart of the Montessuy neighborhood. Vegetation is slowly invading the fort. The tops of a few scarps remain visible, emerging from the ground, as well as a ''dame'', a column of stone that prevented attackers from walking along the top of the enclosure.

It isn't possible to visit the fort, but a few nonprofits have taken up residence in the only surviving building, the barracks, such as AS Caluire - Tir à l'arme de poing or AS Pétanque Caluire. The exterior of the fort has been transformed into green space; there is a skatepark nearby.

== See also ==
- Ceintures de Lyon
- Fort de Caluire
