= Fort de Vancia =

- Lyon in France
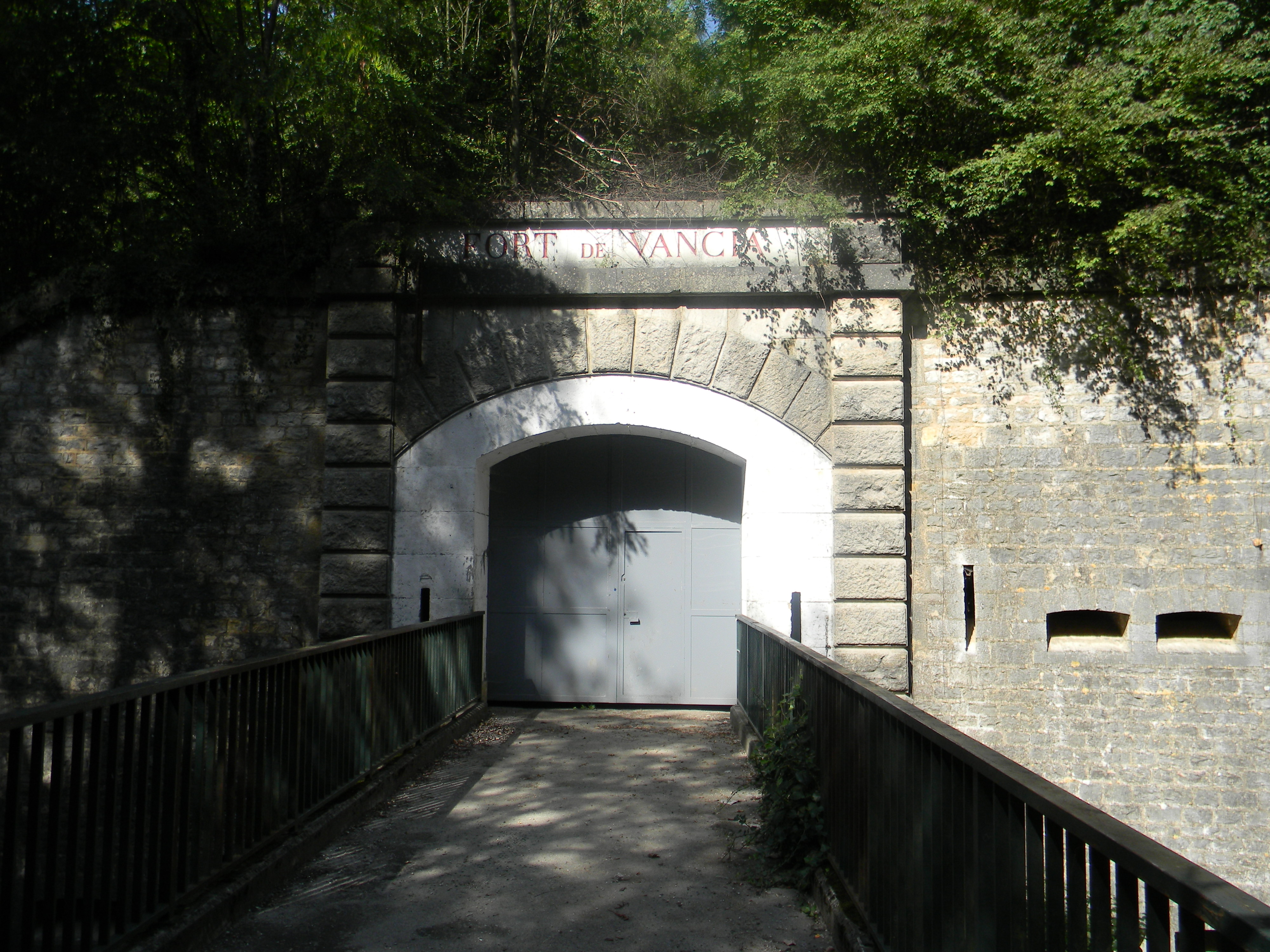
- Subterranean Opening of the fort

Site information
- Type: Fort

Location
- Coordinates: 45.8384498059809°N 4.906854629516602°E

Site history
- Built: 1872–1878

The Fort de Vancia is a former military installation built between 1872 and 1878 in the municipalities of Sathonay-Village and Rillieux-la-Pape, north of Lyon. It is part of the second belt Lyon and more generally the system Sere de Rivieres. This belt of forts included the forts of Bron, Vancia itself, Feyzin and Mont Verdun.

== History ==
This pentagonal fort covers about 18 hectares. Located on the plateau and peak Vancia on Dombes to 332 meters, it is disposed between the height of Mont Verdun and Fort Meyzieu. It has been built primarily for the purpose of resisting German and Italian attack from Bourg-en-Bresse, but also in order to confine a potential revolt of the city of Lyon.

The fort consists of seven batteries of 50 guns and covered by three batteries: Sermenaz, Neyron and Sathonay.

Its organization is very similar plans of the forts of Bron and Feyzin, it is not constructed of concrete but in stone, surrounded by a dry ditch along a kilometer in a building concrete will be added to the barracks of the rider in 1895 . The fort was built on the ground and covered by a result of soil from outside.

The fort had a capacity of 800 soldiers divided into two two-story barracks and is 16,000 m², with fifty pieces, two coal-fired ovens, shops and arsenals, two stables, four kitchens, a bakery, four wells, a water tank, a laundry, an infirmary, a forge, and fifty guns. It cost at the time of building 3 million gold francs.

The barracks are composed, on the ground floor of a barn or a shop, with the garrison of the rooms upstairs. Each room has an area of 120 square meters, and housed 25 men arranged in two bunk beds and an officer in a single bed. Meals were served in your room, the bread was suspended in each to protect from rats. Grooves within each window can barricade in case of danger. The path along the barracks is called the street walls and was crossed by a rail allowing, through horse-drawn wagons, to supply the guns quickly.

Two magazines of 70t and 68T provide ammunition to eleven shooting platforms which are placed at the top of the structure on the ridge of high fire and bunkers indirect fire mortar type. Because of the ever-present risk of explosion of the powder by spark, access and layout of magazines included some points:

- Skylights can move inside;
- movements in the magazine were made in wooden shoes;
- bins allow sand to absorb moisture.

Access to the fort was controlled by a caponier placed on a ravelin built into the rock in front of the pit itself crossed by a crane on rollers. A thick wooden door studded prevents access of the caponier entrance. An iron gate will be added in 1906 before the bridge.

The fort served during the First World War to the French troops, a huge time sink collective is still visible today.

Before 1939 and after World War II, it served as a logistics centre consolidation for reservists and the volunteers, as well as deposit. In 1942, when the fort was still in the free zone. It was used for testing rocket EA-41 by Colonel Jean-Jacques Barre.

The fort served as a prison for Germans towards the end of World War II, including opponents of the regime of Franco as well as Habib Bourguiba, former president of Tunisia.

It remained the property of the army until 1999.

== Today ==
Unoccupied for a long time, the fort is now occupied by dense vegetation.

The fort of Vancia currently depend on a single-purpose municipal association, owned by the municipalities of Sathonay-Village and Rillieux-la-Pape . The fort served as occasional training fields for the police, emergency services. The shooting center has always remained property of the Department of Defense. The fort is regularly open for Heritage Days.

The fort was occupied illegally from 4 February 2011 at 18 May 2011 by a group called The fallow Vancia, strong collective self (CFA), the police carried out the evictions and deposited concrete blocks outside the gates and access.

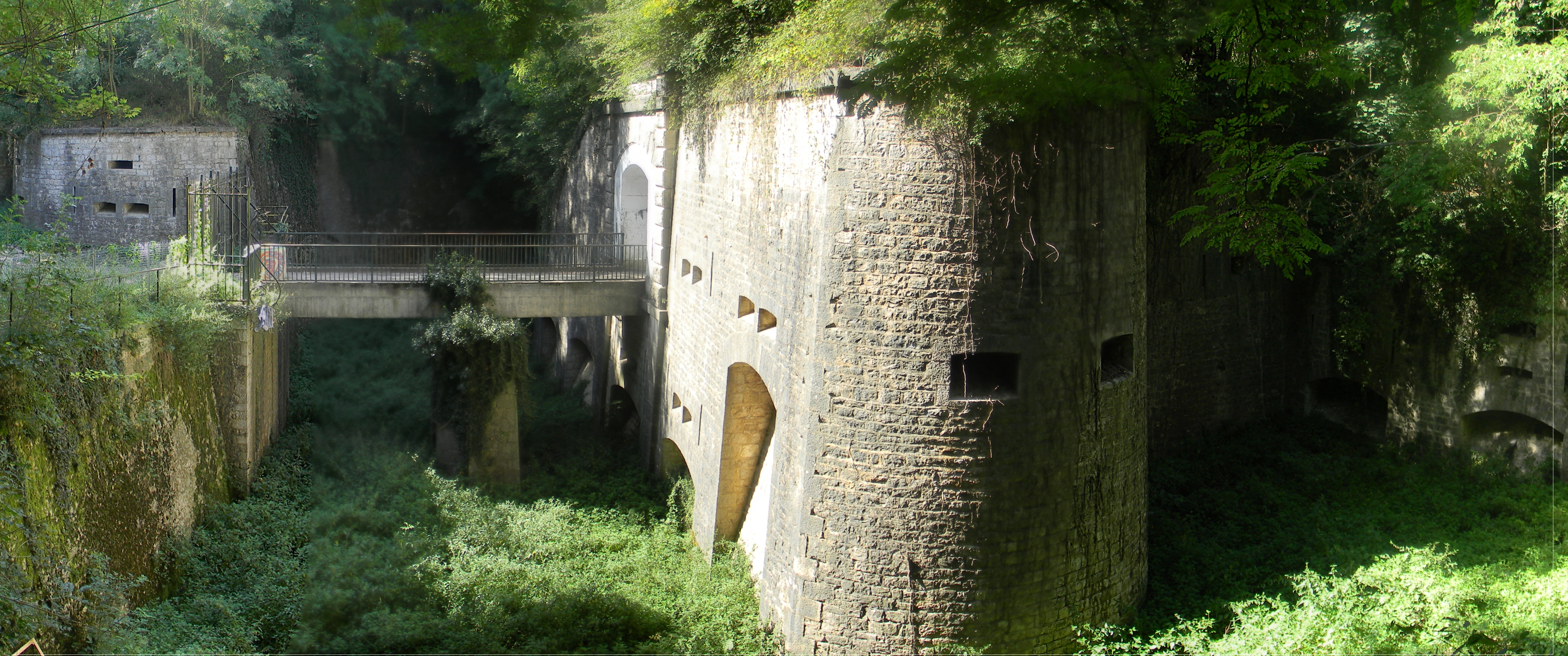
Panoramic view from the front gate from left to right: Ravelin, a bunker, grid, bridge, caponier gate, all surrounded by a moat.

== See also ==
- Ceintures de Lyon
