= Fort du Bruissin =

Fort in Francheville, France

- Part of Fortifications of Lyon, Séré de Rivières system
- Metz, France
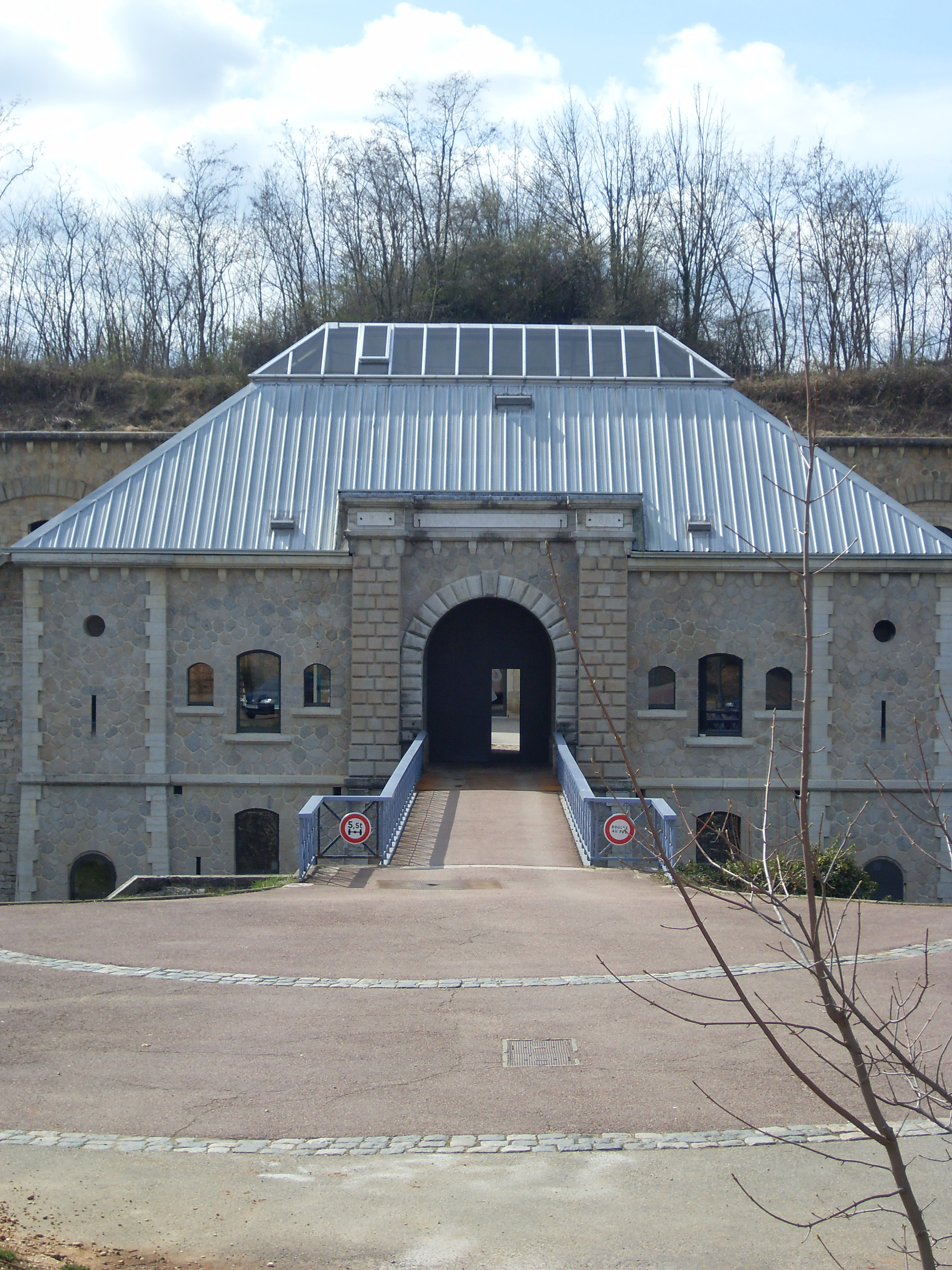

Site information
- Type: Fort
- Owner: Commune de Francheville
- Controlled by: France
- Open to the public: Yes
- Condition: Restored as cultural center

Location
- Location within Metropole de Lyon
- Coordinates: 45.730532°N 4.738508°E

Site history
- Built: 1878
- Materials: Stone, concrete

The Fort du Bruissin is a fort in Francheville, France, near the city of Lyon. Built between 1878 and 1881, the fort is part of the Séré de Rivières system of fortifications built in the late 19th century. It has been rehabilitated as a contemporary artists' community. The Fort en Jazz festival is held there each year.

== Concept and design ==
The Fort de Bruissin is located about 8.5 kilometres (5.3 mi) to the southeast of the center of Lyon. Lyon's original protective ring of forts was built in the 1830s at a distance from the city just beyond the range of the artillery of the era, thus denying a potential attacker the means to bombard Lyon. With the introduction of rifled artillery, the range increased, placing the city once again into jeopardy. In the 1870s a second ring of forts was built farther out to deal with the extended range of artillery. Work on the second ring of eighteen forts was complete by 1893. The Fort du Bruissin was number 13 in the Army's numerical designation of the forts of Lyon.

The Fort de Bruissin is a six-sided polygon, with masonry walls surrounded by a defended ditch. The most striking feature of the fort is its entry court, reached through a gatehouse at the head of a bridge over the ditch. A two-level vaulted barracks faces the gatehouse across the court, covered with earth. A terrace or cavalier on top of the barracks was shielded by an earth rampart. The fort was primarily armed with a mixture of 155mm and 120mm guns. located on the cavalier within the walls of the fort. Close-in defense was provided by revolving cannons in large caponiers at the corners of the fort, reached by subterranean passages. The fort was initially manned by 294 men, serving a total of thirty artillery pieces.

== History ==
The Fort du Bruissin is part of the second ring of the fortifications of Lyon. During World War I the fort was a training center for future officers. During World War II, the fort was occupied by the Germans, who used it as an ammunition depot and headquarters.

In 1981 the fort was sold to the commune of Francheville. In 1988 the entry was renovated, followed by the barracks in 1989. In 1991 the fort became a community of contemporary artists. It has been the home of the Fort en Jazz festival since 1990.

=== Arts center ===
The fort now functions as a center for visual and performing arts. The 10-hectare (25-acre) grounds are a community park and nature preserve. Approximately 3000 square meters of space is available within the fort, with about 800 square meters of exhibition space. A venue for the performing arts is located behind the barracks, to accommodate up to 2000 spectators.

== Gallery ==
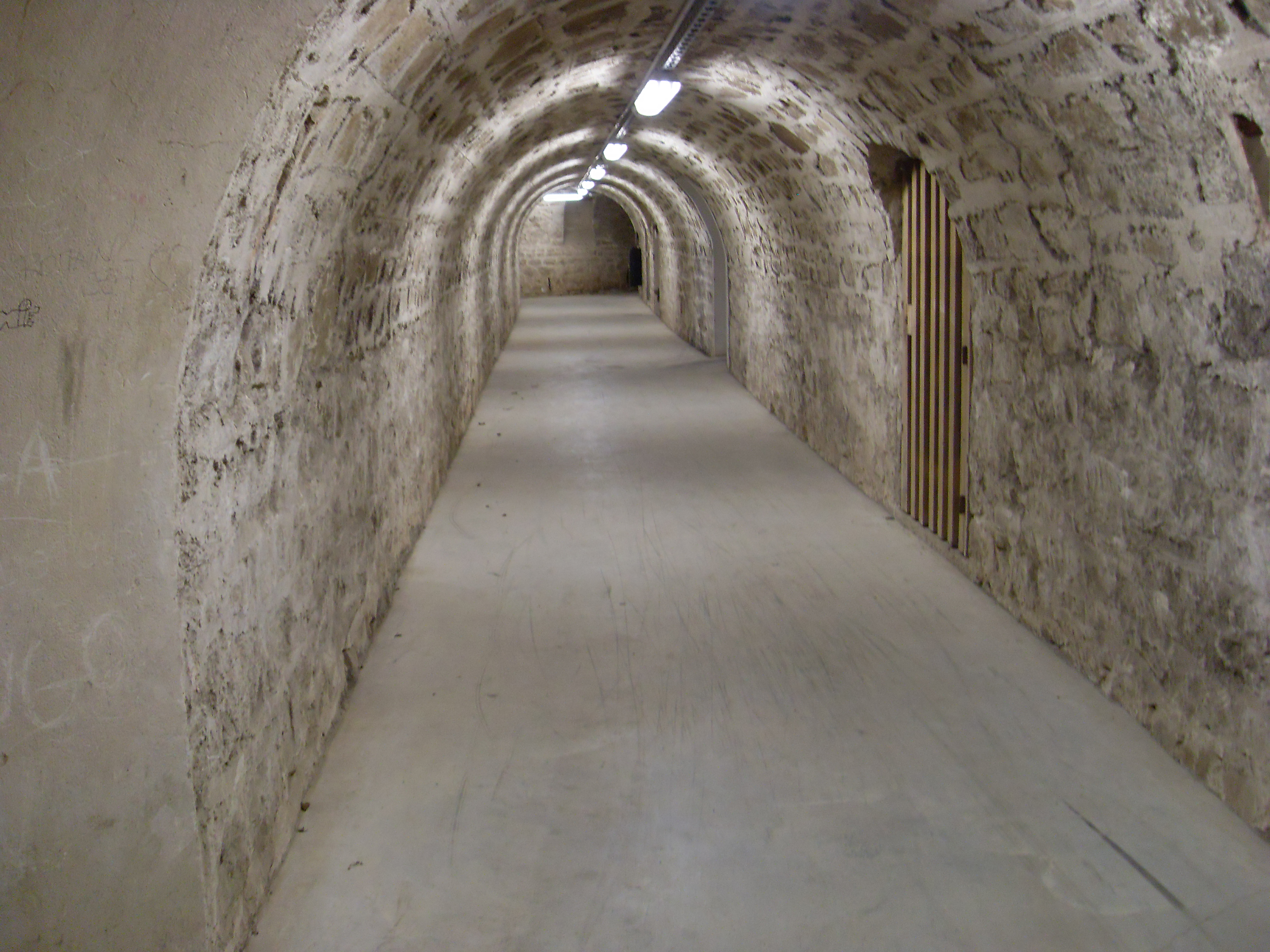
Underground passage

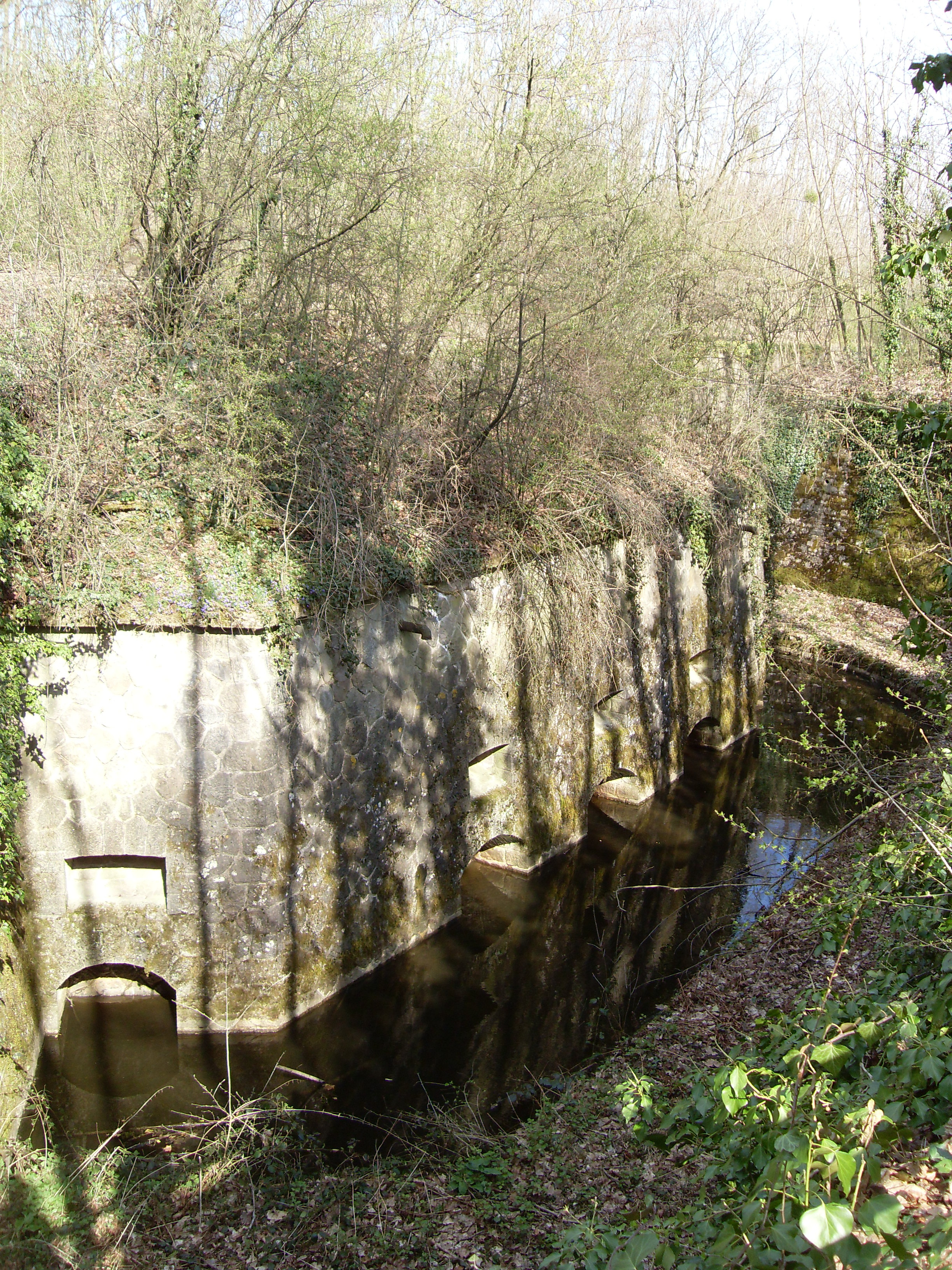
Water-filled ditch

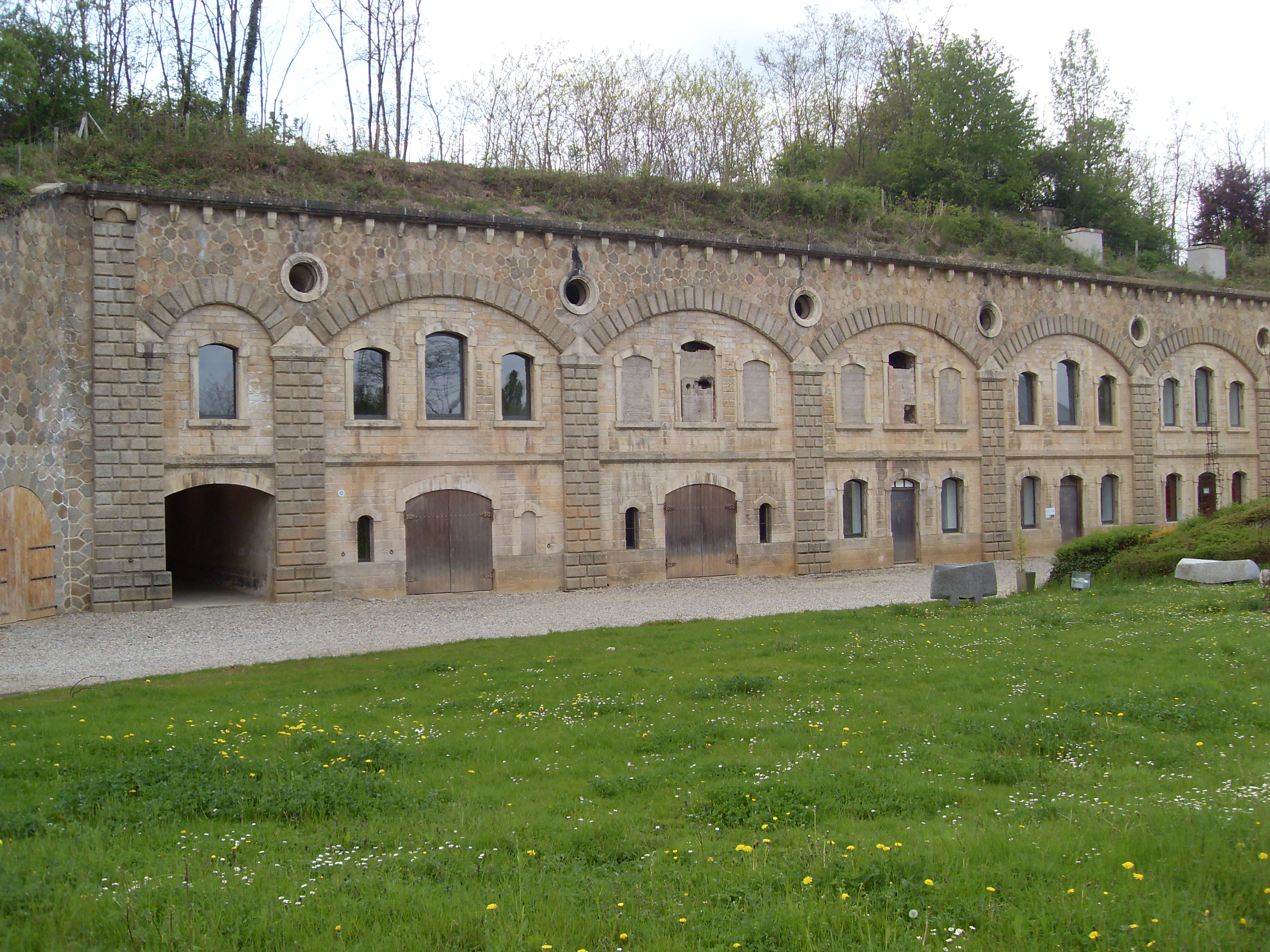
Front façade of the barracks

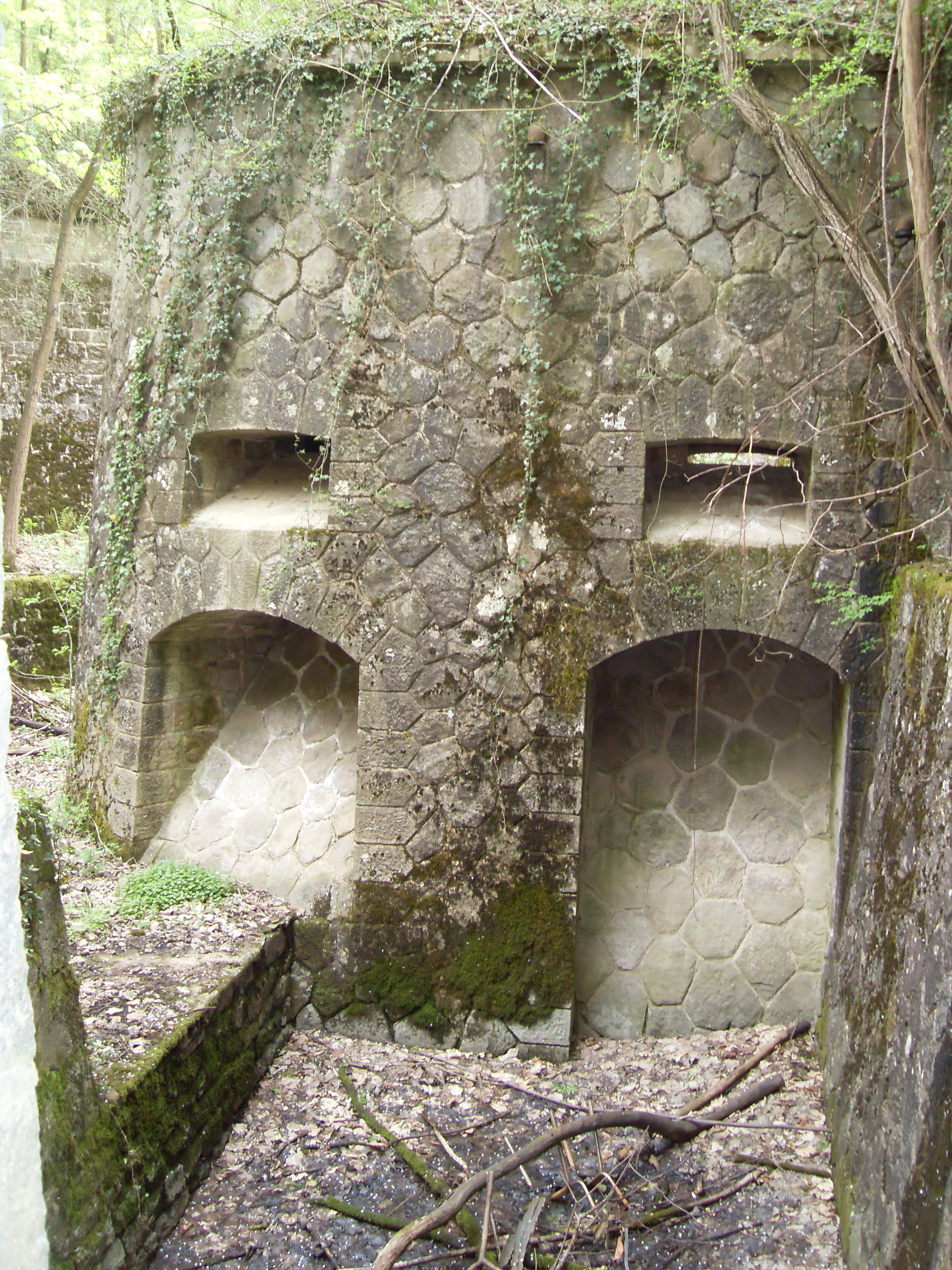
Defensive ditch

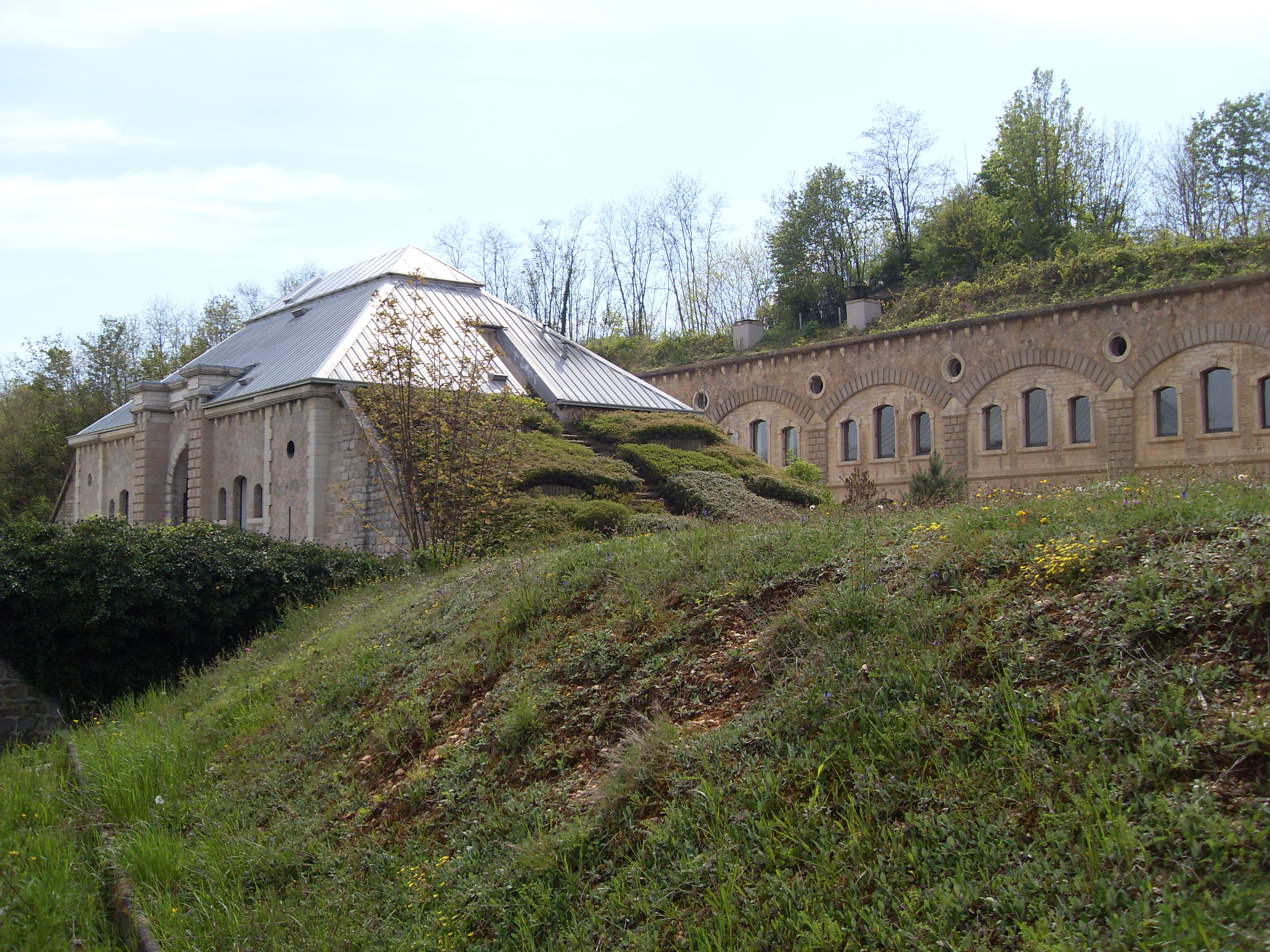
Principal entry

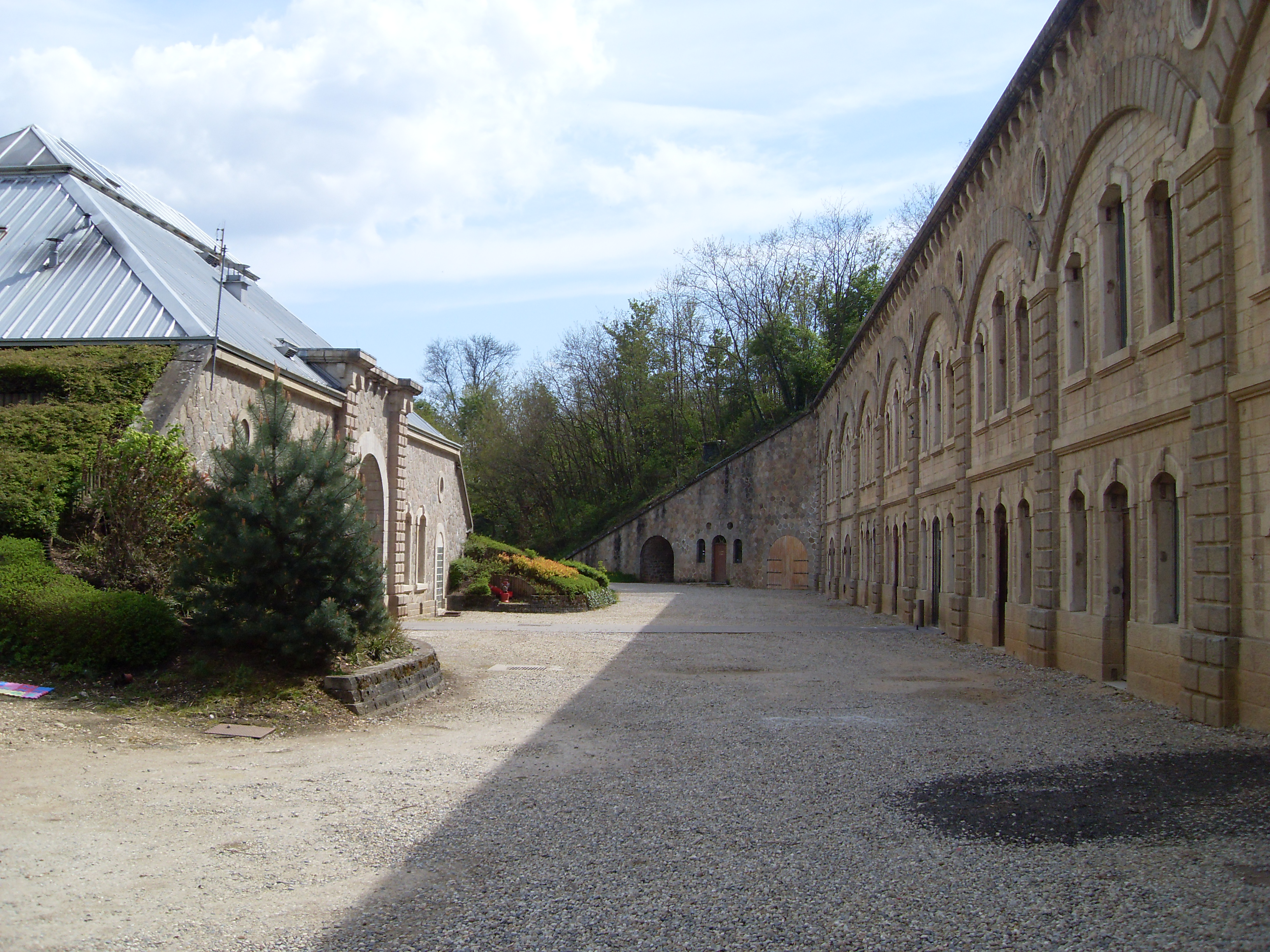
Court between the entry and the main barracks

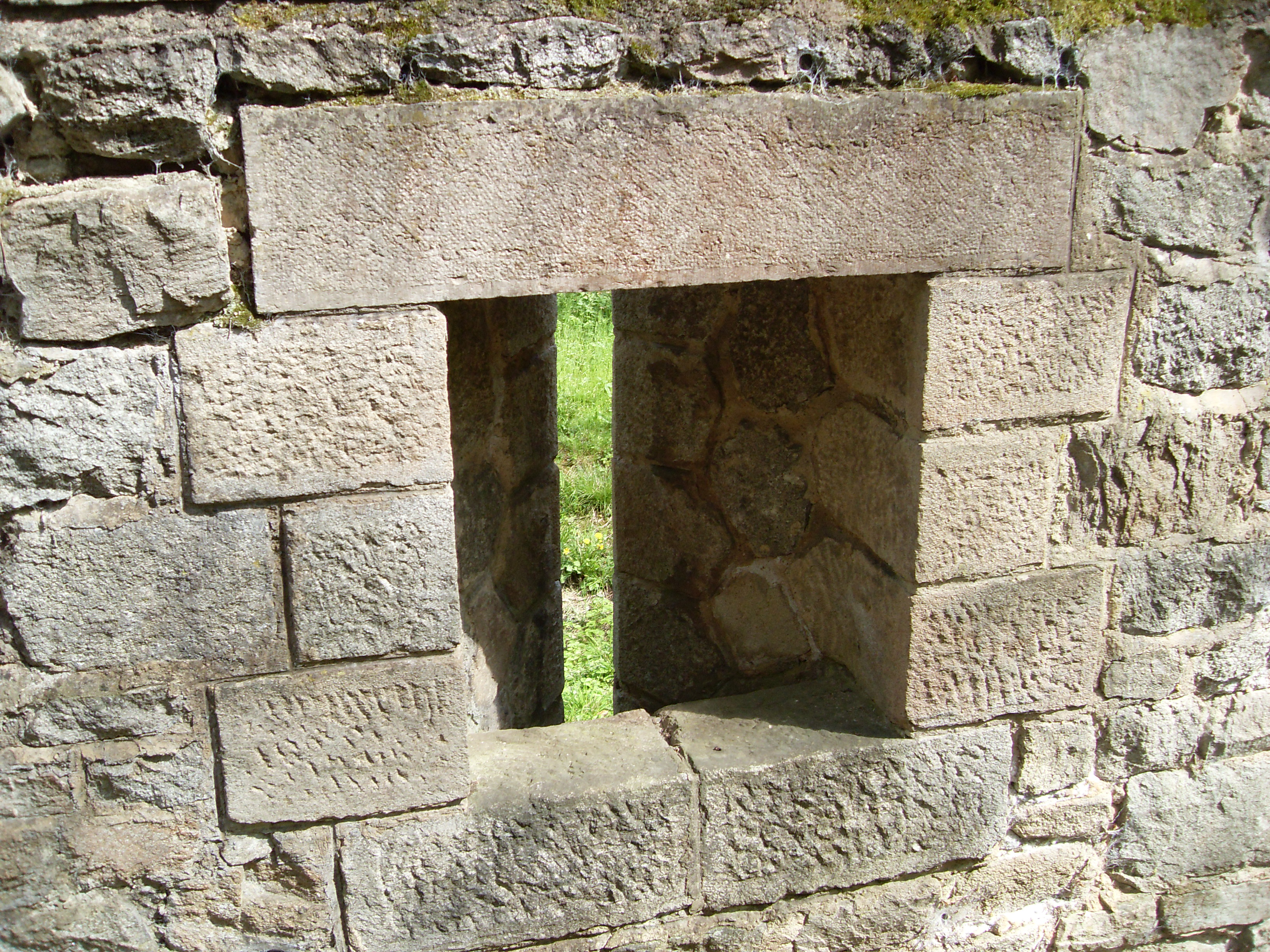
Firing port

== See also ==
- Ceintures de Lyon
