= Lyon – Mont Verdun Air Base =

French Air Force base

Coordinates: 45°51′00″N 4°47′00″E

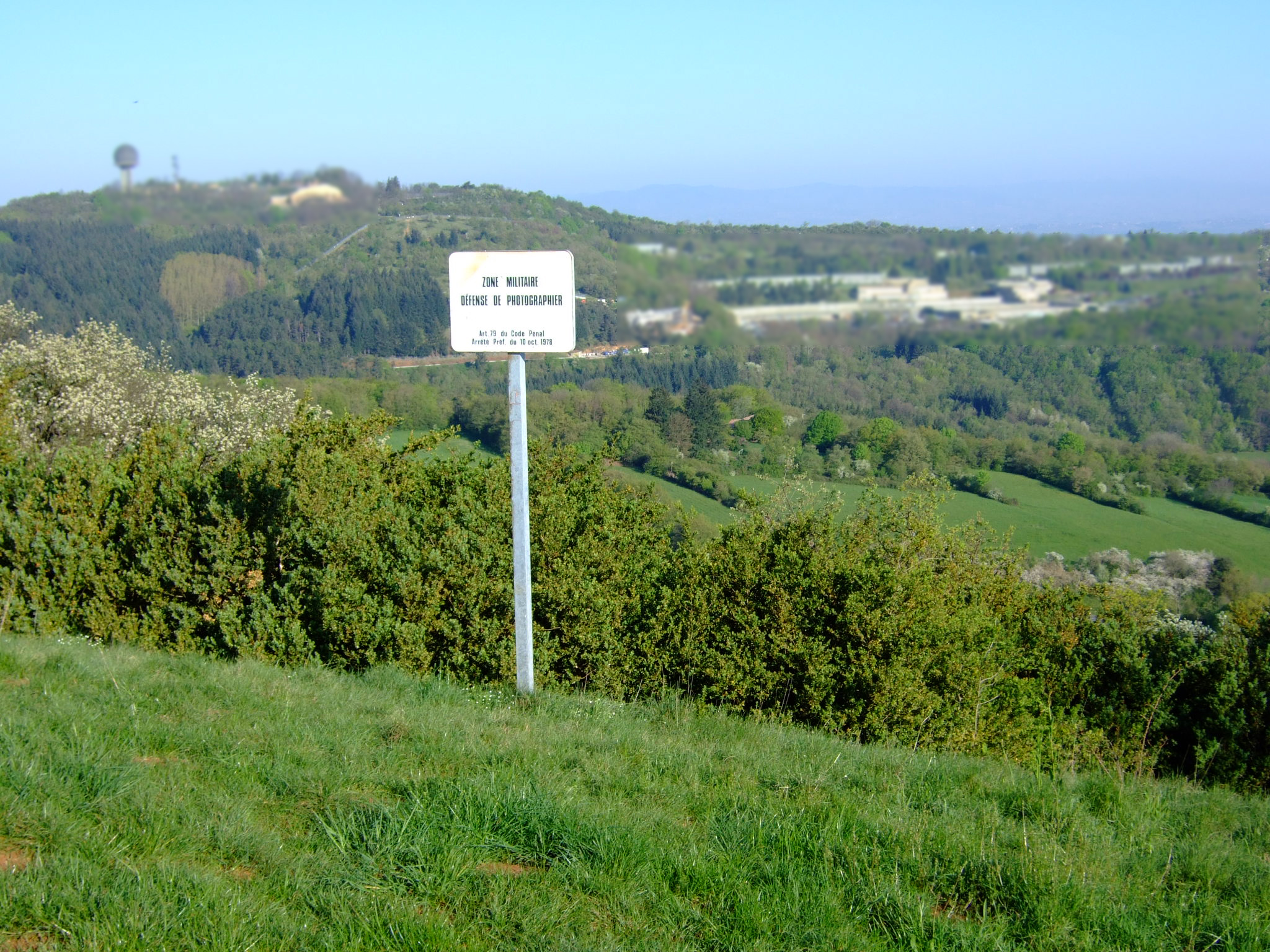
Lyon – Mont Verdun Air Base

Lyon – Mont Verdun Air Base (Base Aérienne 942) is located to the northwest of Lyon. It is a center for air defense operations transferred to the site from the now-deactivated headquarters of the French Air Force at Taverny Air Base – BA921 near Paris, with an underground alternate strategic command center hardened against chemical and nuclear attack.

The location includes the South Sector Operations Center of the Commandement de la Défense Aérienne et des Opérations Aériennes (CDAOA or Air Defense and Operations Command), which is connected to NATO's Air Command and Control System (ACCS).
