= Louis Philippe style =

Architectural style

The style of architecture and design under King Louis Philippe I (1830–1848) was a more eclectic development of French neoclassicism, incorporating elements of neo-Gothic and other styles. It was the first French decorative style imposed not by royalty, but by the tastes of the growing French upper class. In painting, neoclassicism and romanticism contended to become the dominant style. In literature and music, France had a golden age, as the home of Frédéric Chopin, Franz Liszt, Victor Hugo, Honoré de Balzac, and other major poets and artists.

Much of the style was taken from the personality of the King himself. Unlike his Bourbon predecessors, he wore business dress, not formal robes, he lived in Paris, and he shunned ceremonies; he carried his own umbrella, and imposed no official styles.

Louis Philippe furniture had the same types and forms as the earlier French Restoration style, but with less decoration; comfort was the primary consideration. The Louis Philippe commode, with a marble top and a marquetry covering, was a popular example of the style.

== Architecture ==
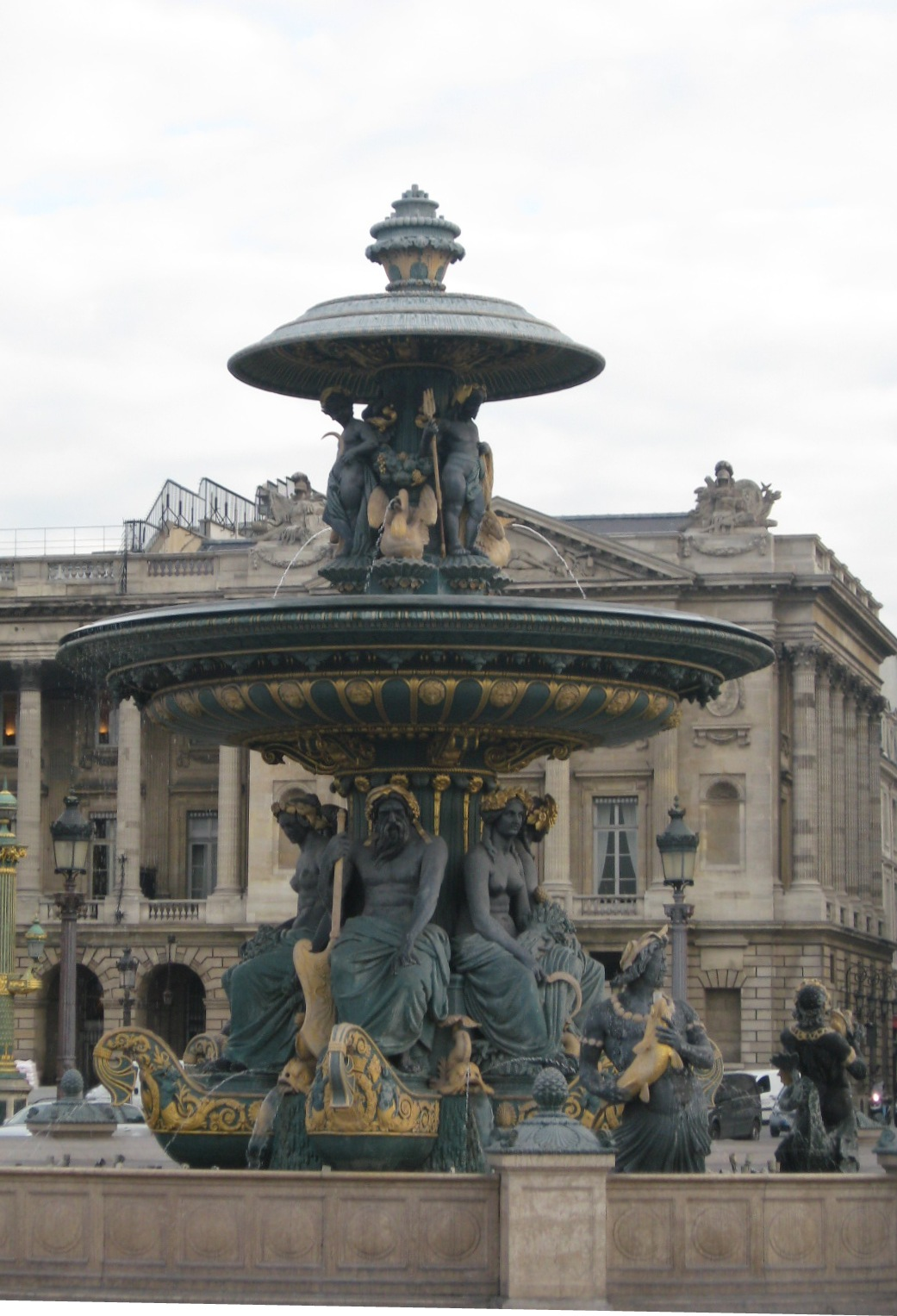
Fountain in the Place de la Concorde by Jacques Ignace Hittorff (1840)

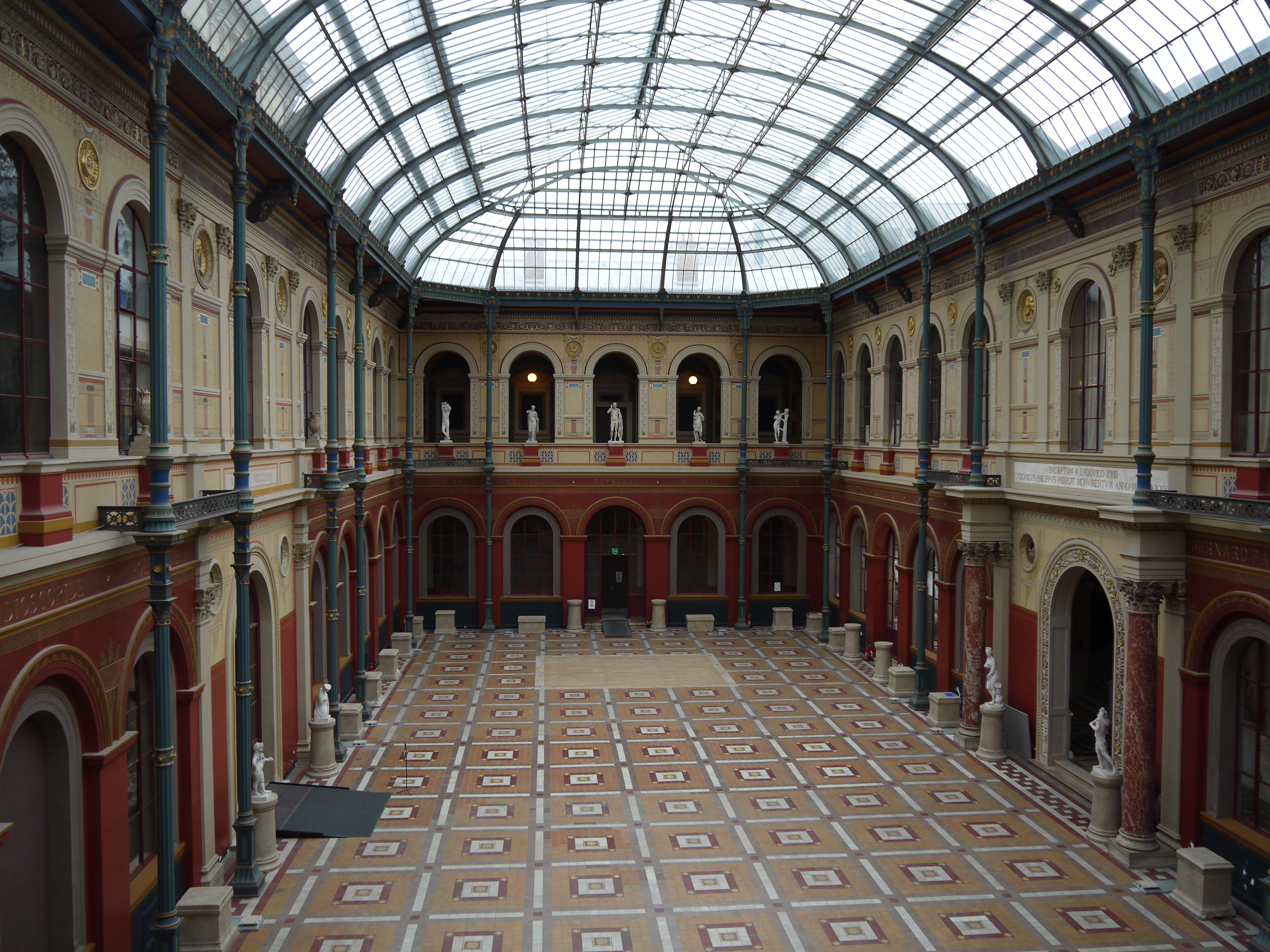
Courtyard of the École des Beaux-Arts (1832–70) by Félix Duban

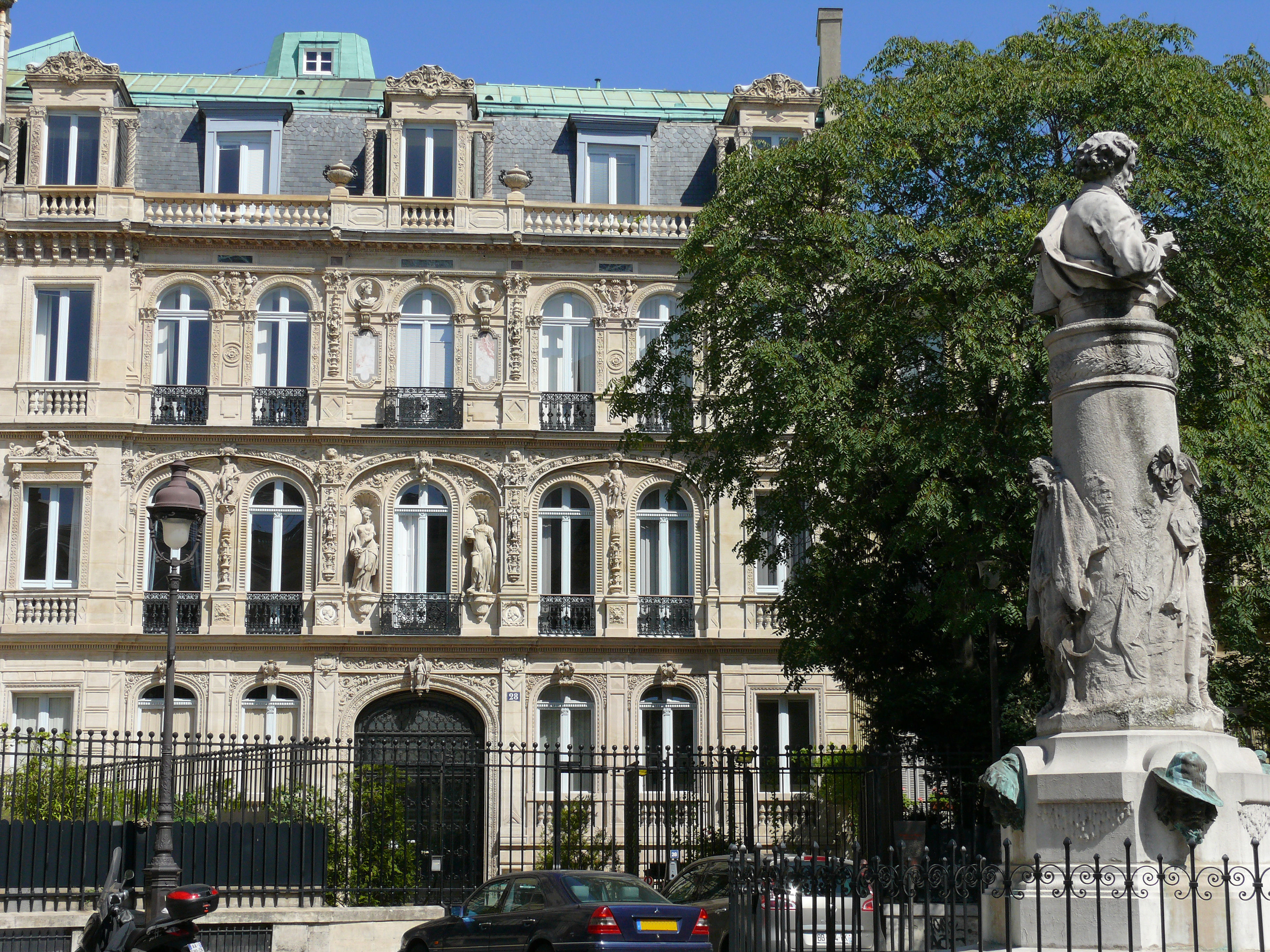
Neo-Renaissance hotel particulier on Place Saint-Georges by Édouard Renaud (1841)

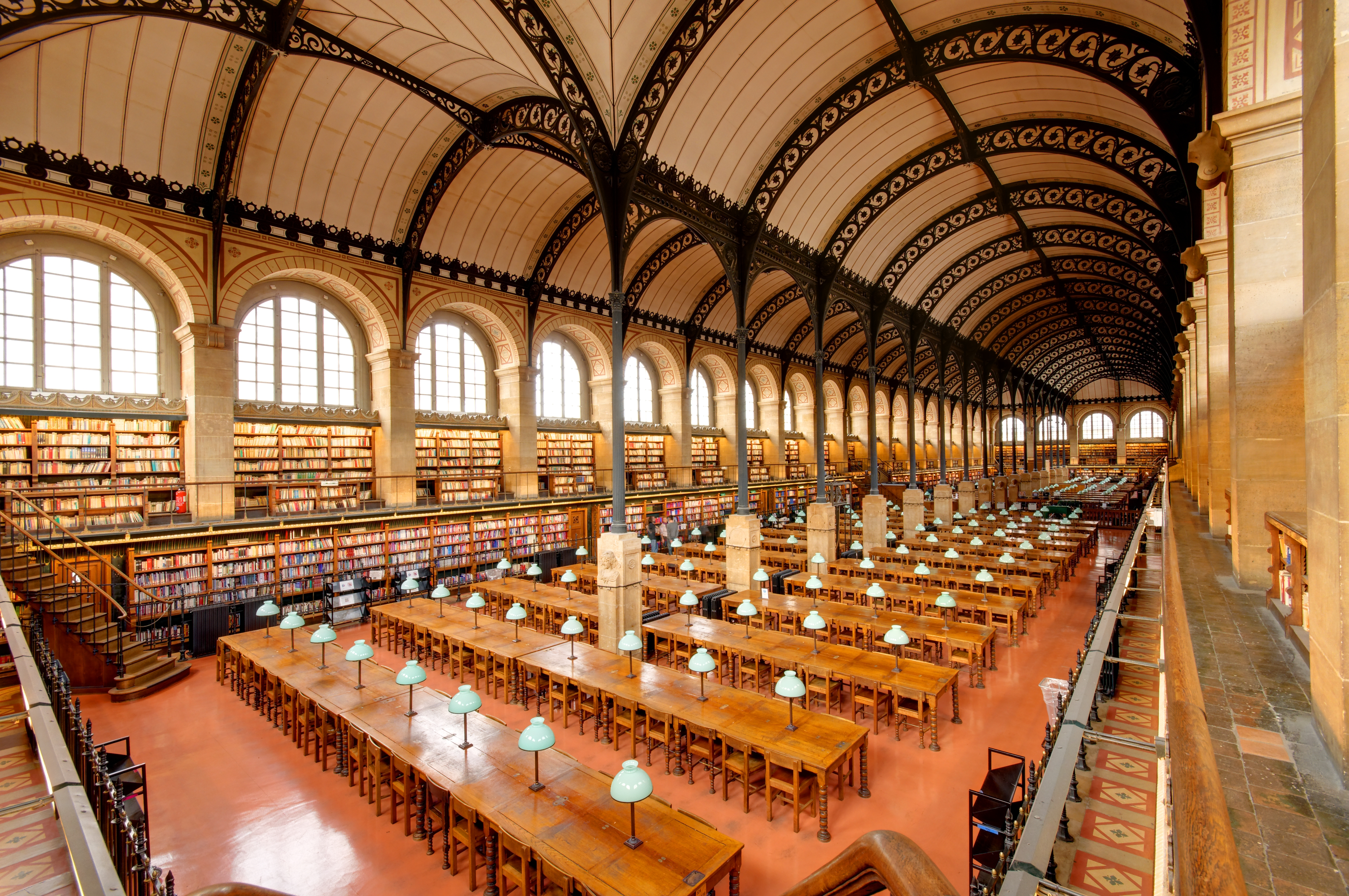
Interior of the Sainte-Geneviève Library (1844–50) by Henri Labrouste

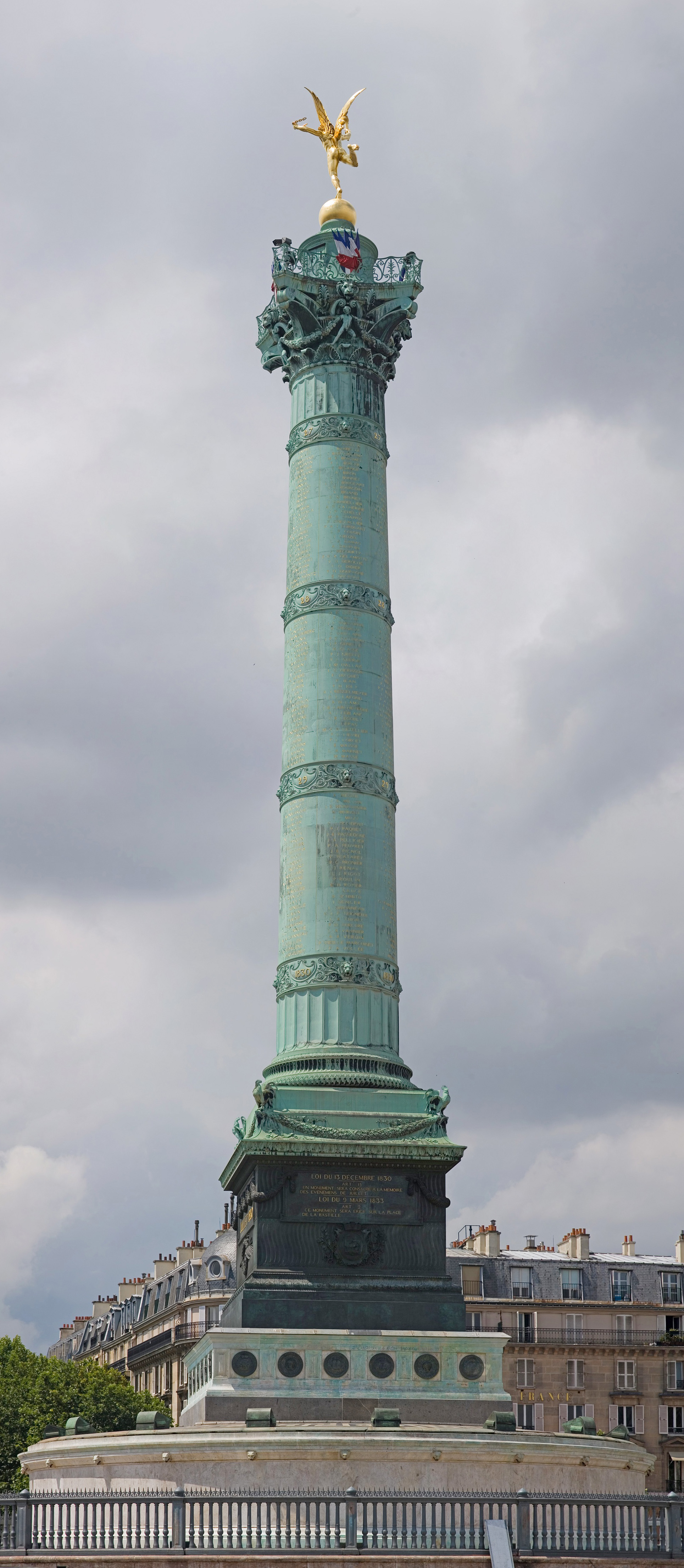
The July Column in the Place de la Bastille (1831–40) by Joseph-Louis Duc

The style of public buildings under Louis-Philippe was determined by the Académie des Beaux-Arts, or Academy of Fine Arts, whose Perpetual Secretary from 1816 to 1839 was Quatremère de Quincy, a confirmed neoclassicist. The architectural style of public buildings and monuments was intended to associate Paris with the virtues and glories of ancient Greece and Rome, as it had been under Louis XIV, Napoleon and the Restoration. Under Louis Philippe, the monuments begun by Napoleon, including the Arc de Triomphe were completed. New monuments, such as the Luxor Obelisk in the Place de la Concorde and the July Column in Place de la Bastille were purely classical. The July Column was inaugurated on 28 July 1840, on the anniversary of the July Revolution, and dedicated to those killed during the uprising. Following the return to Paris of the ashes of Napoleon from Saint Helena in 1840, they were placed with great ceremony in a tomb designed by Louis Visconti beneath the church of Les Invalides.

The reign of Louis-Philippe also saw the beginning of a movement to preserve and restore some of the earliest landmarks of Paris, inspired in large part by Victor Hugo's hugely successful novel The Hunchback of Notre-Dame (Notre-Dame de Paris), published in 1831. The leading figure of the restoration movement was Prosper Mérimée, named by Louis-Philippe as the Inspector-General of Historic Monuments. The Commission of Public Monuments was created in 1837, and in 1842, Mérimée began compiling the first official list of classified historical monuments, now known as the Base Mérimée.

The first structure to be restored was the nave of the church of Saint-Germain-des-Prés, the oldest in the city. Work also began in 1843 on the cathedral of Notre-Dame, which had been badly damaged during the Revolution, and stripped of the statues on its façade. Much of the work was directed by the architect and historian Viollet-le-Duc, who sometimes, as he admitted, was guided by his own scholarship of the "spirit" of Medieval architecture, rather strict historical accuracy. The other major restoration projects were Sainte-Chapelle and the Hôtel de Ville, dating to the 17th century; the old buildings which pressed up against the back of the Hôtel de Ville were cleared away; two new wings were added, the interiors were lavishly redecorated, and the ceilings and walls of the large ceremonial salons were painted with murals by Eugène Delacroix. Unfortunately, all the interiors were burned in 1871 by the Paris Commune.

=== The Beaux-Arts style ===
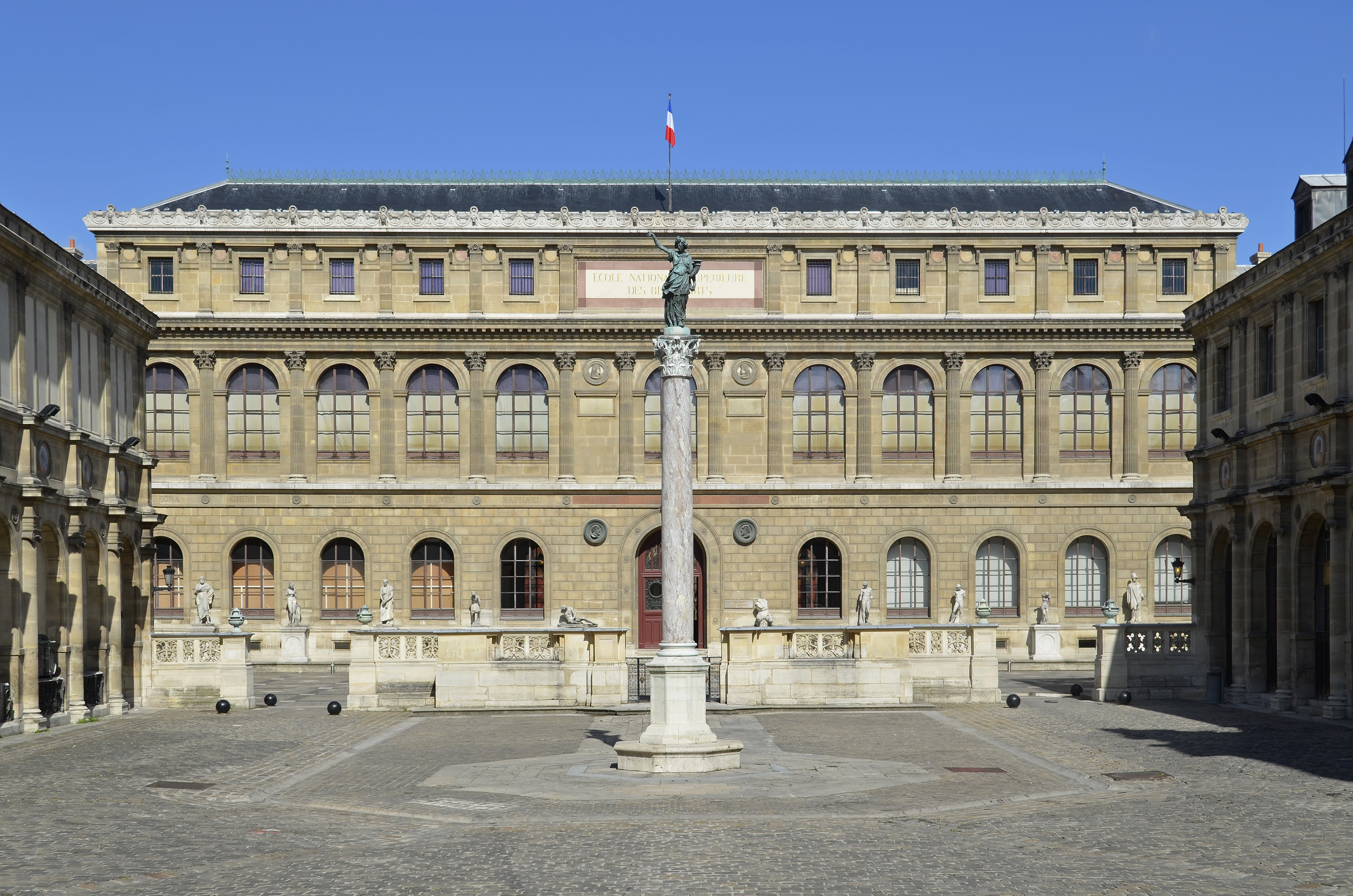
The École des beaux-arts by François Debret (1819–32) then Félix Duban (1832–70)

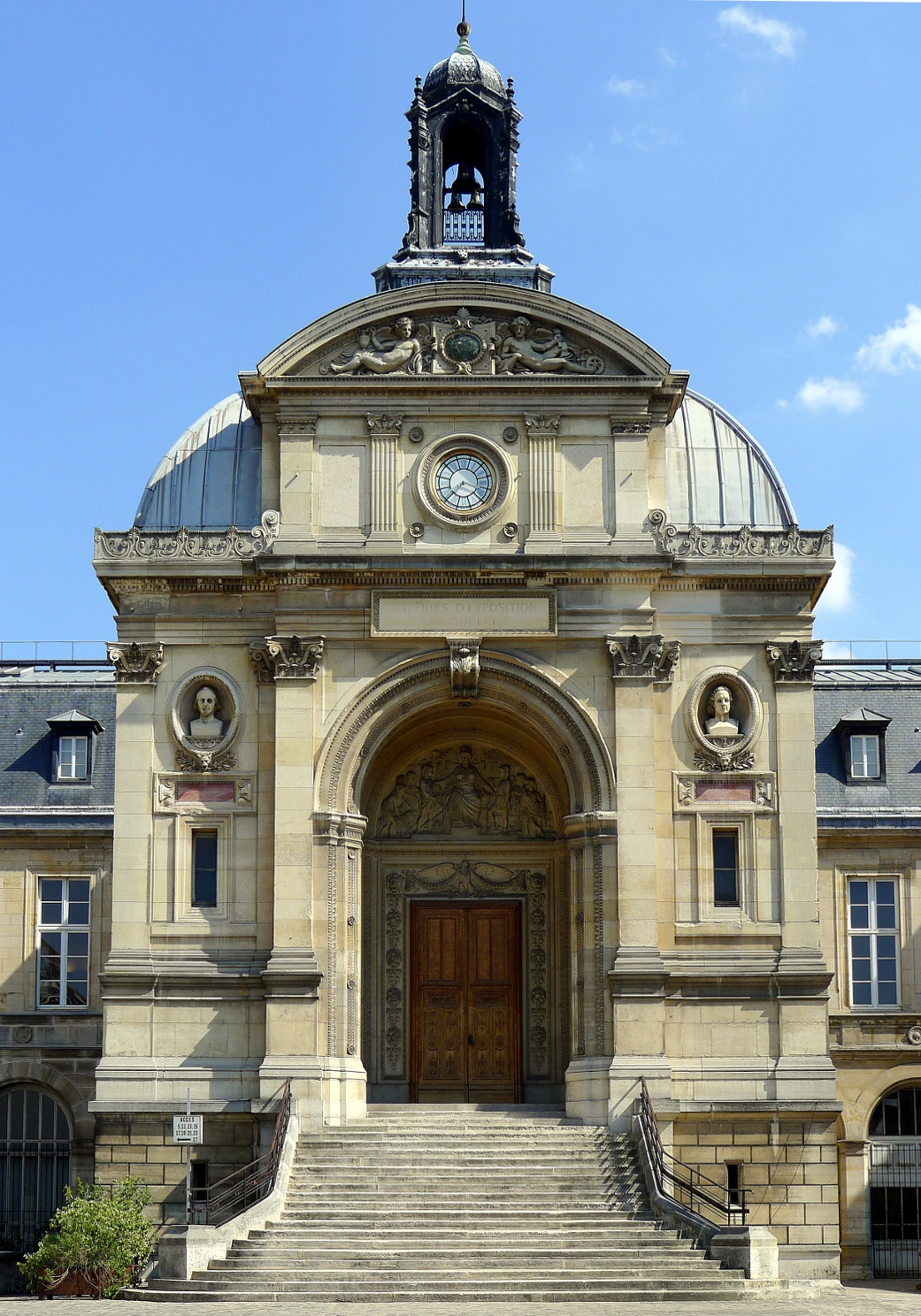
The Conservatoire national des arts et métiers by Léon Vaudoyer (1838–67)

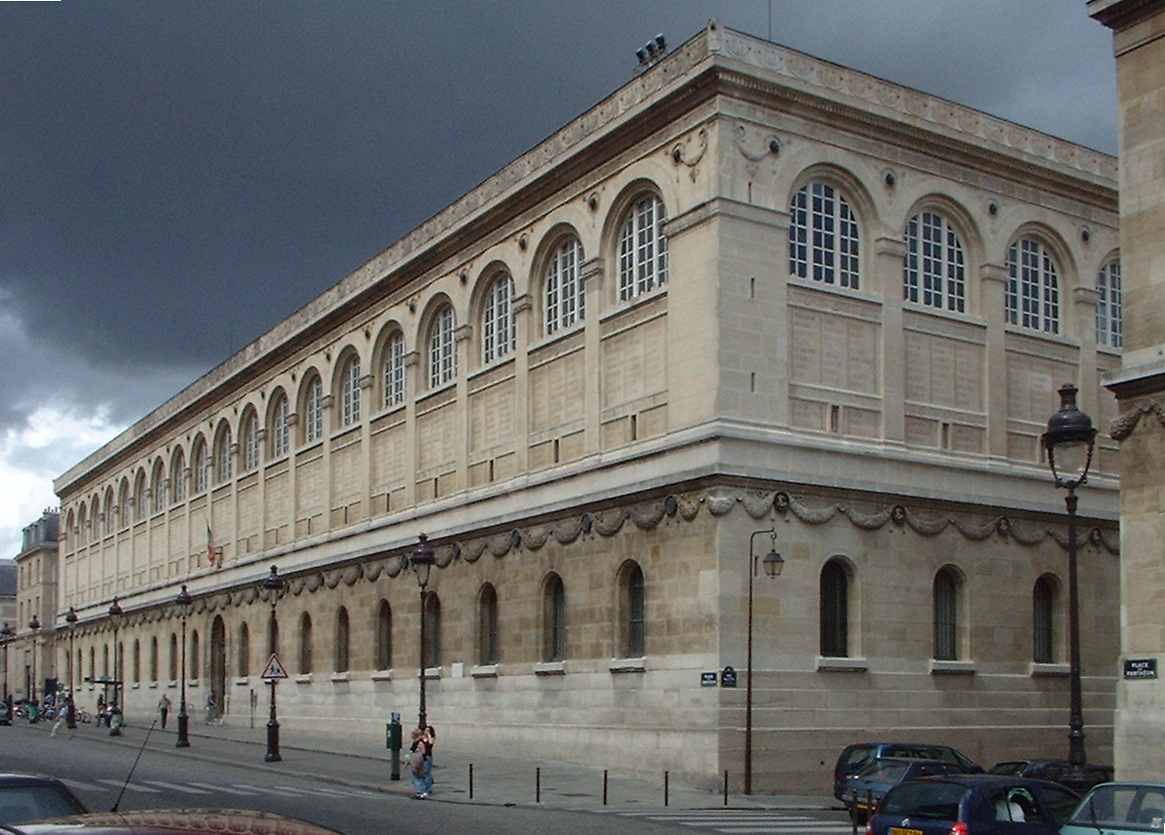
The Sainte-Geneviève Library by Henri Labrouste (1844–50)

During the same period, a small revolution was taking place at the École des Beaux-Arts, led by four young architects; Joseph-Louis Duc, Félix Duban, Henri Labrouste and Léon Vaudoyer, who had first studied Roman and Greek architecture at the French Academy in Rome, then in the 1820s began the systematic study of other historic architectural styles including French architecture of the Middle Ages and Renaissance. They instituted teaching about a variety of architectural styles at the École des Beaux-Arts, and installed fragments of Renaissance and Medieval buildings in the courtyard of the school so students could draw and copy them. Each of them also designed new non-classical buildings in Paris inspired by a variety of different historic styles; Labrouste built the Sainte-Geneviève Library (1844–50); Duc designed the new Palais de Justice and Court of Cassation on the Île-de-la-Cité (1852–68); Vaudroyer designed the Conservatoire national des arts et métiers (1838–67), and Duban designed the new buildings of the École des Beaux-Arts. Together, these buildings, drawing upon Renaissance, Gothic, Romanesque and other non-classical styles, broke the monopoly of Neoclassical architecture in Paris.

== Furniture ==
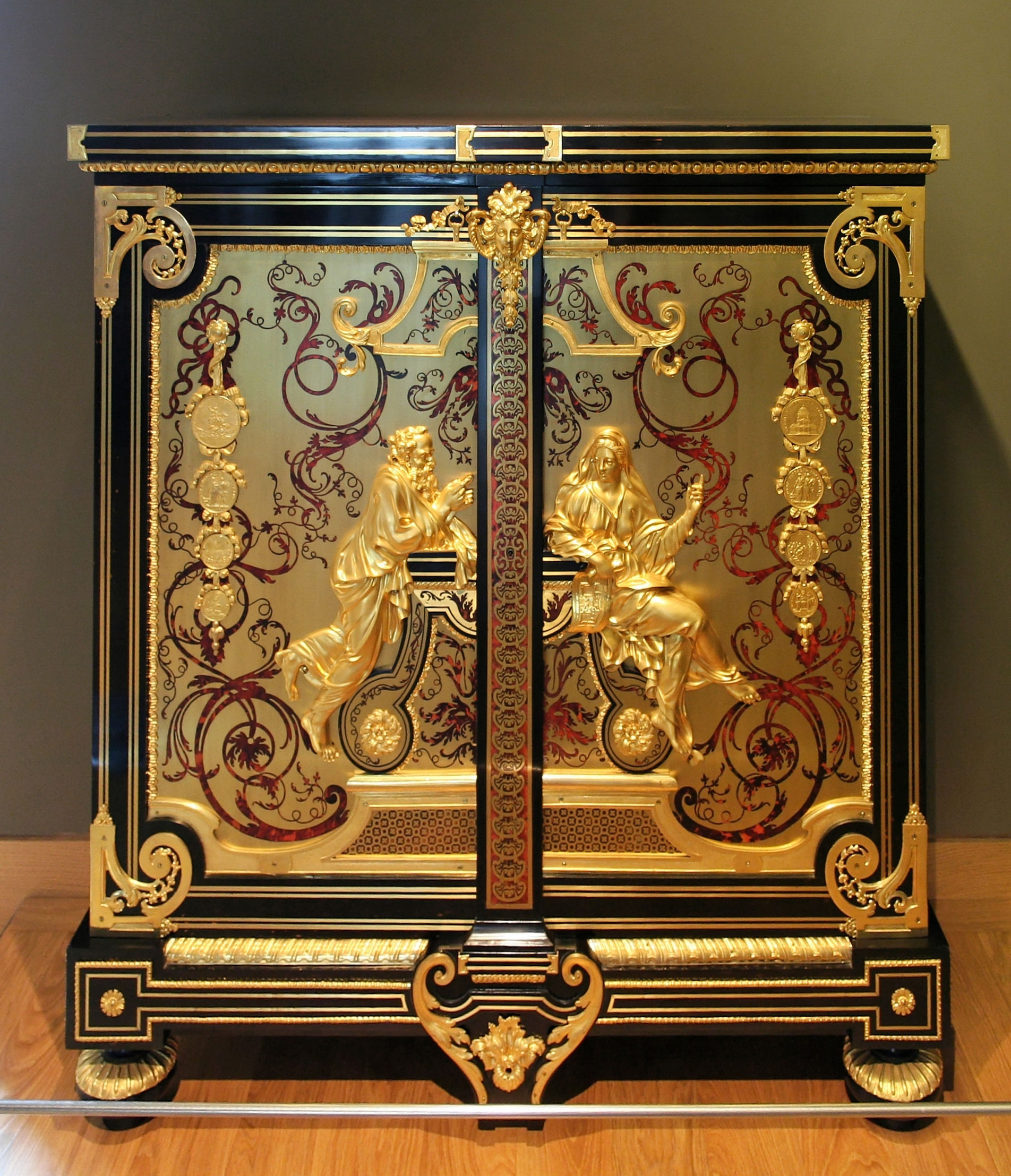
Cabinet for Tuileries Palace by Georges-Alphonse Jacob-Desmalter (1834)

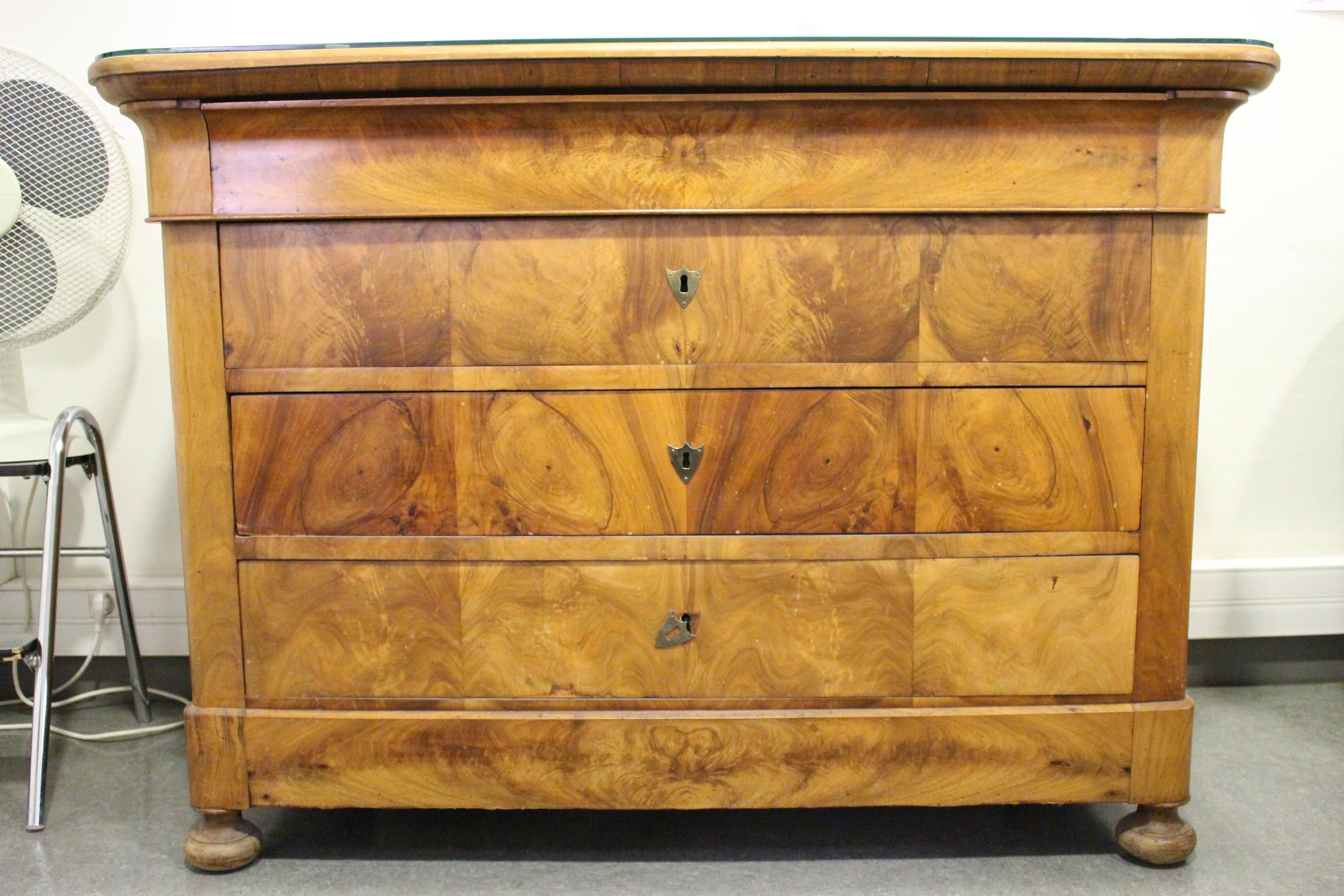
Louis Philippe commode

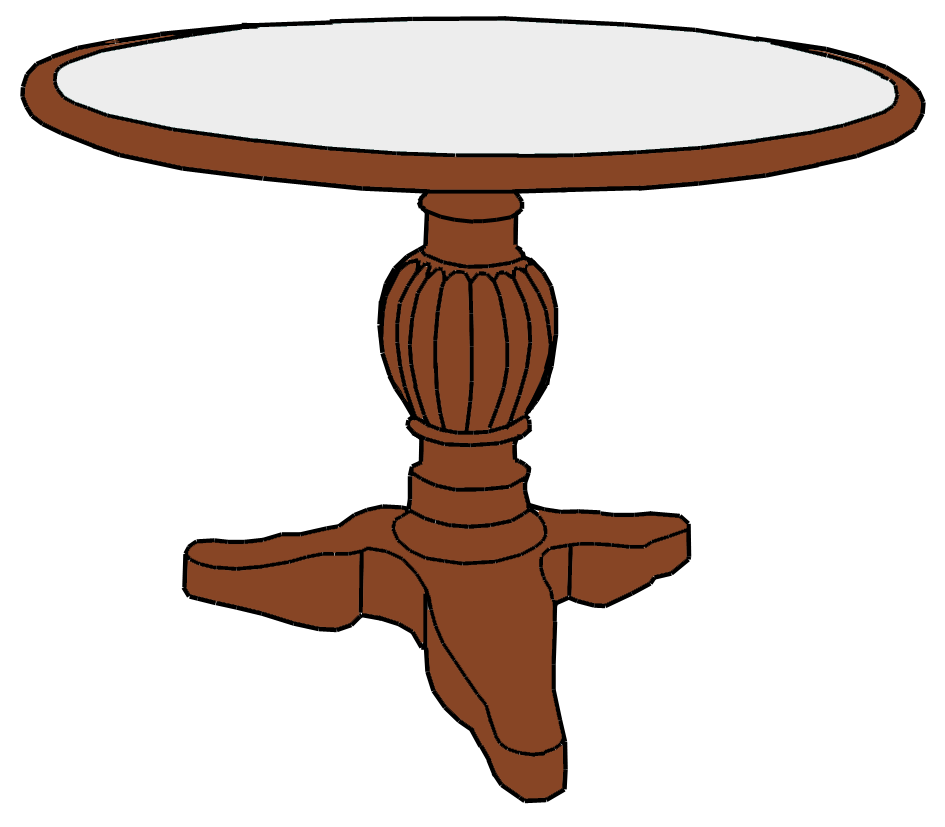
Louis Philippe gueridon, or pedestal, table

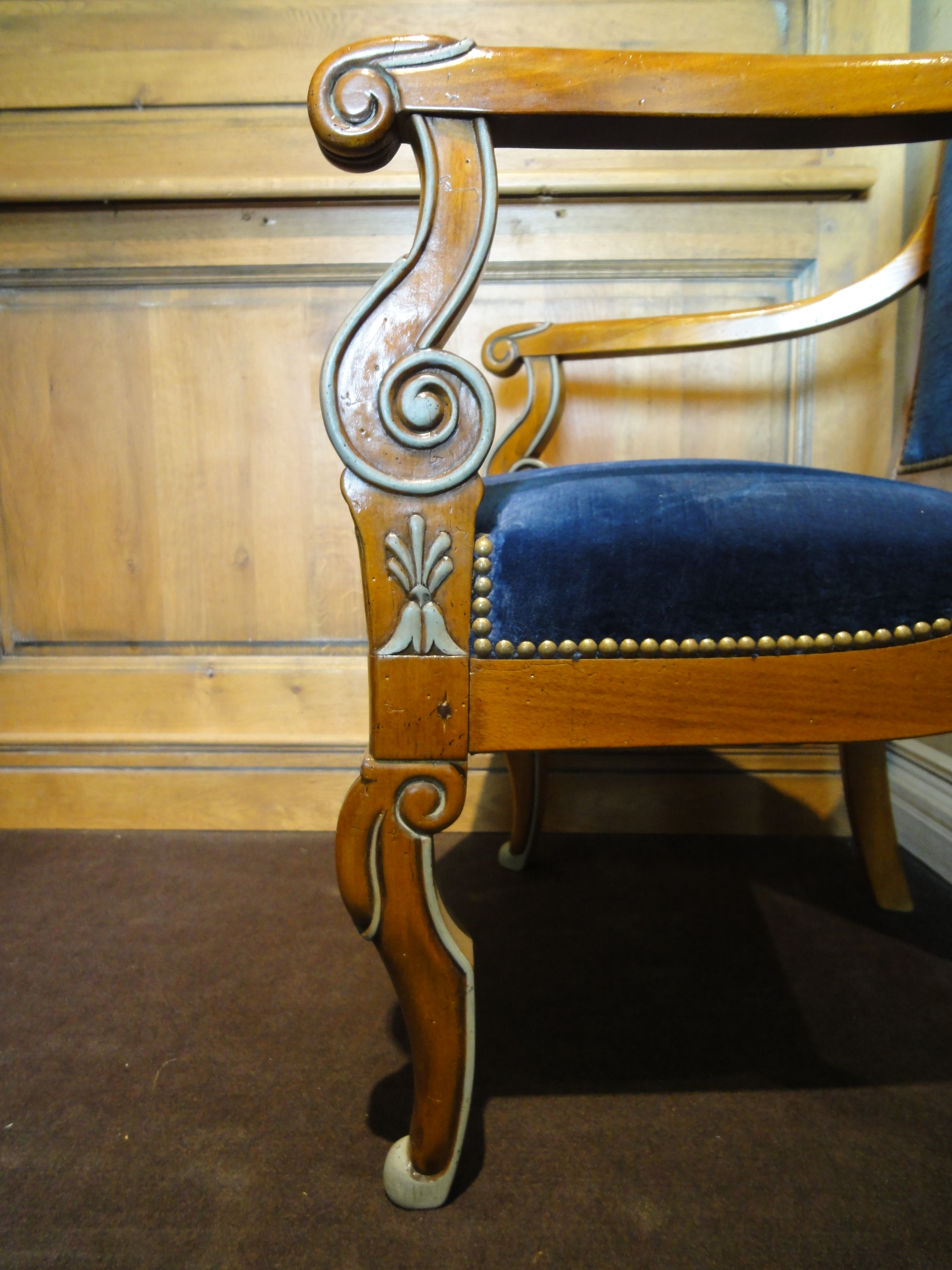
Decoration of a Louis Philippe armchair

Finely-crafted inlaid furniture in the traditional fashion continued to be made in Paris by craftsmen such as Georges-Alphonse Jacob-Desmalter (1799–1870), the grandson of Georges Jacob, the royal cabinet maker for Louis XVI. He designed and made new furniture for the Tuileries Palace when it became the new residence of Louis Philippe in the 1830s, including a cabinet for the concert room decorated with an incrustation of ebony, red seashell and gilded bronze sculptural decoration (see gallery).

During the reign of Louis Philippe, forms of furniture changed little from the French Restoration period; comfort became a greater priority. Furniture became darker and heavier. The forms of chairs became rounded, with curving legs, and the backs of armchairs curved slightly in inward. In the gondola armchairs and chairs, the curved back and arms curved around and enfolded the person sitting. The Voltaire armchair had a high slightly curving back, padded armrests, and short legs.

The Louis Philippe commode was solid and heavy, and had a marble top and a front covered with a thin layer of light wood, often with an inlay of designs of dark wood, usually rosewood or mahogany, in patterns of oak leaves, palmettes, or other floral or vegetal decoration. Over the course of the period, the coloring was reversed; the darker woods were used more commonly to cover the furniture, with lighter woods like sycamore, holly and lemon wood used for inlays.

Tables were usually round or oval, often mounted on a pedestal, with cut-off or slanting corners. A variety of small tables became popular: writing tables, work tables, and the coiffeuse, or dressing table, equipped with an oval mirror. The legs of these tables were often in the shape of an S or of a lyre.

== Sculpture ==
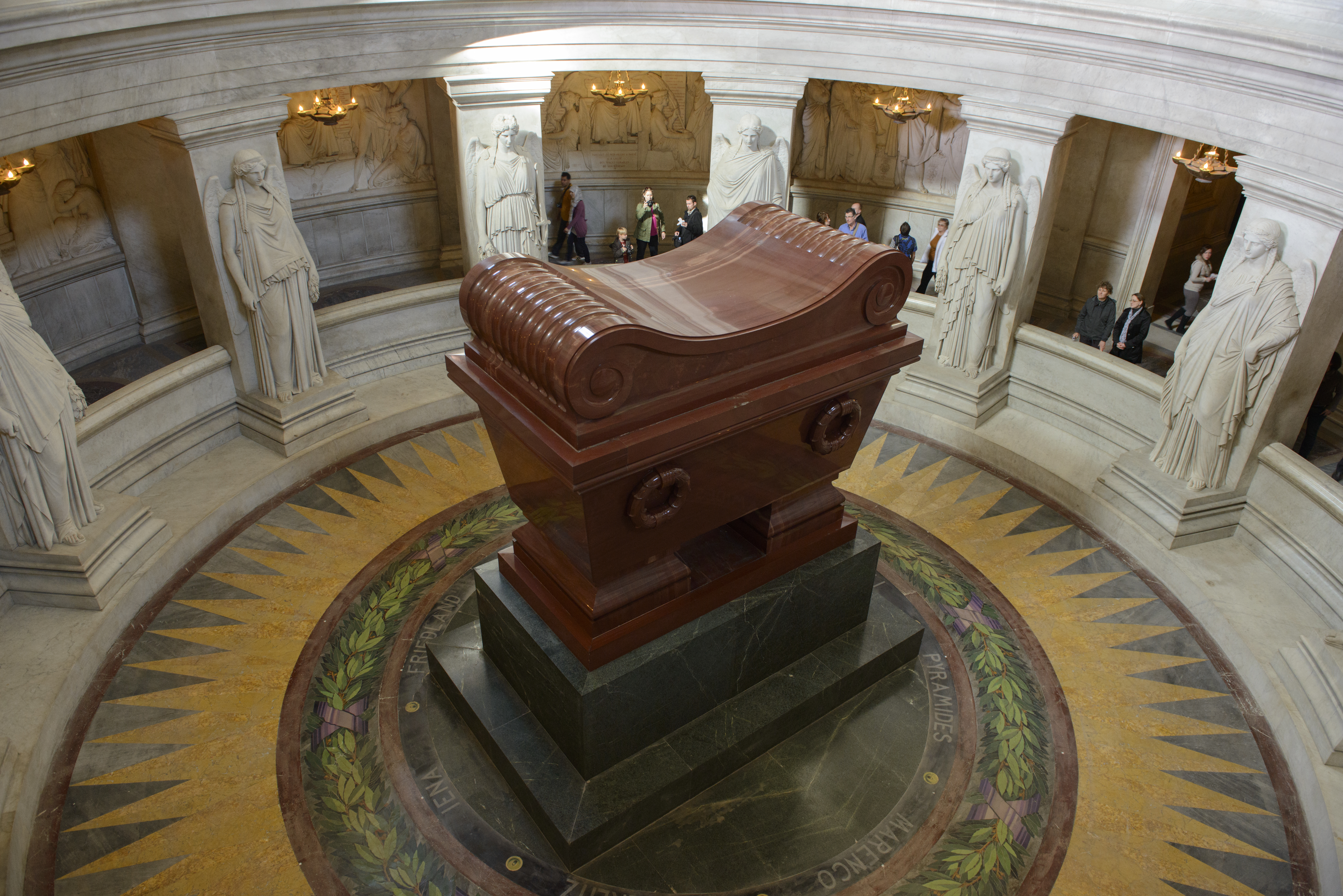
Tomb of Napoleon, surrounded by statues of Victories, by James Pradier

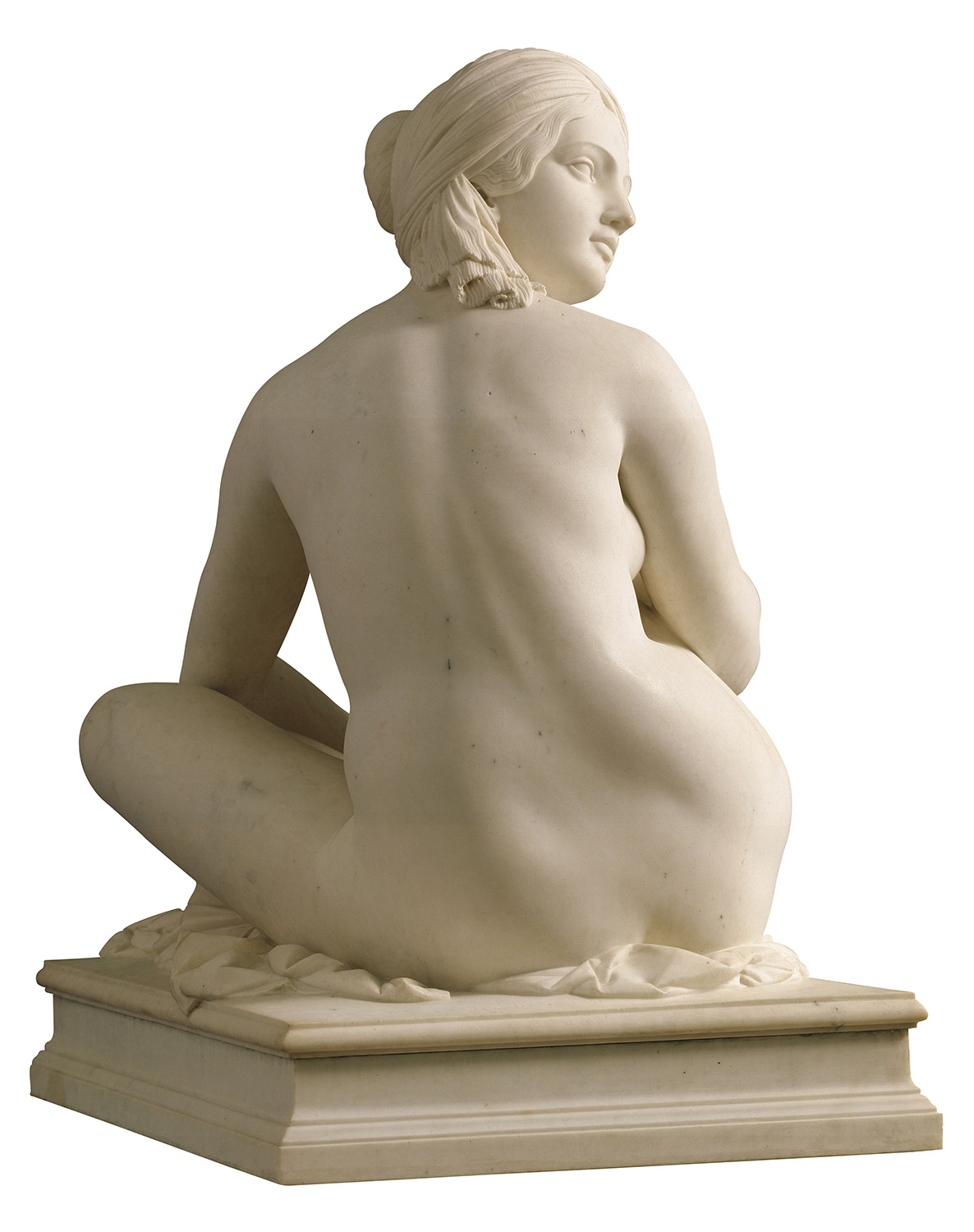
Odalisque by James Pradier, (1841) (Louvre)

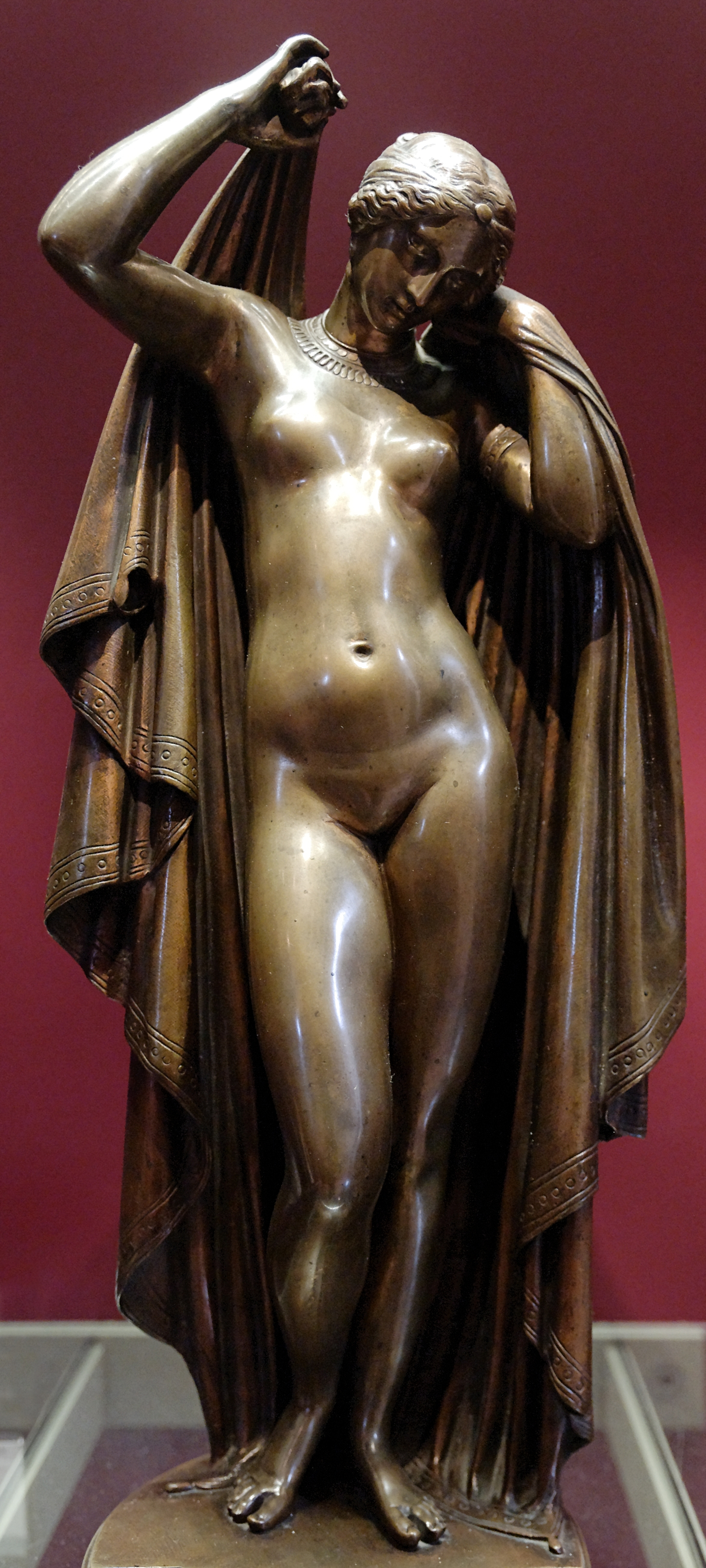
Phryne removing her veil by James Pradier (1845) (Louvre)

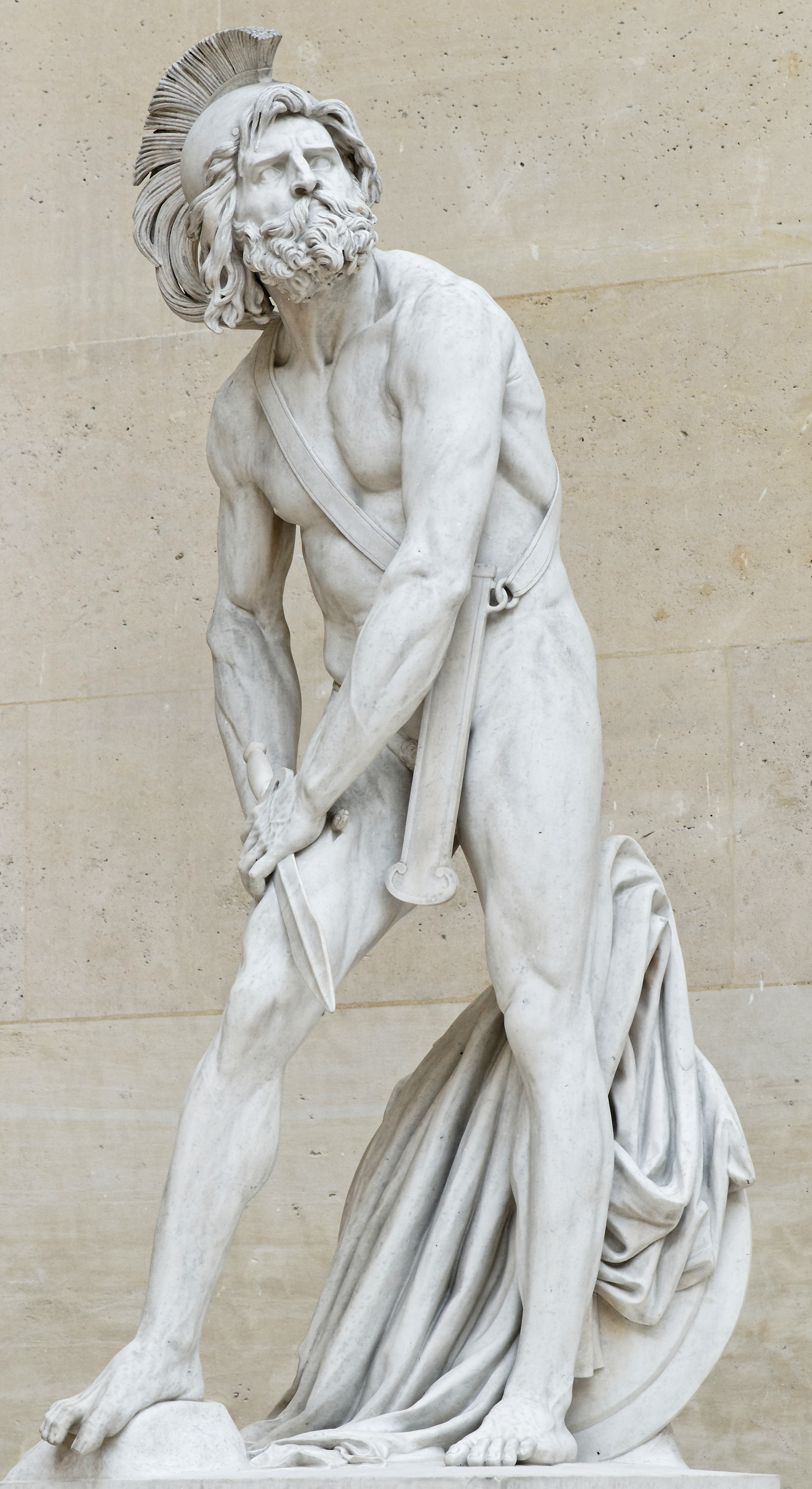
Philopoemen hurt by David d'Angers (1837)

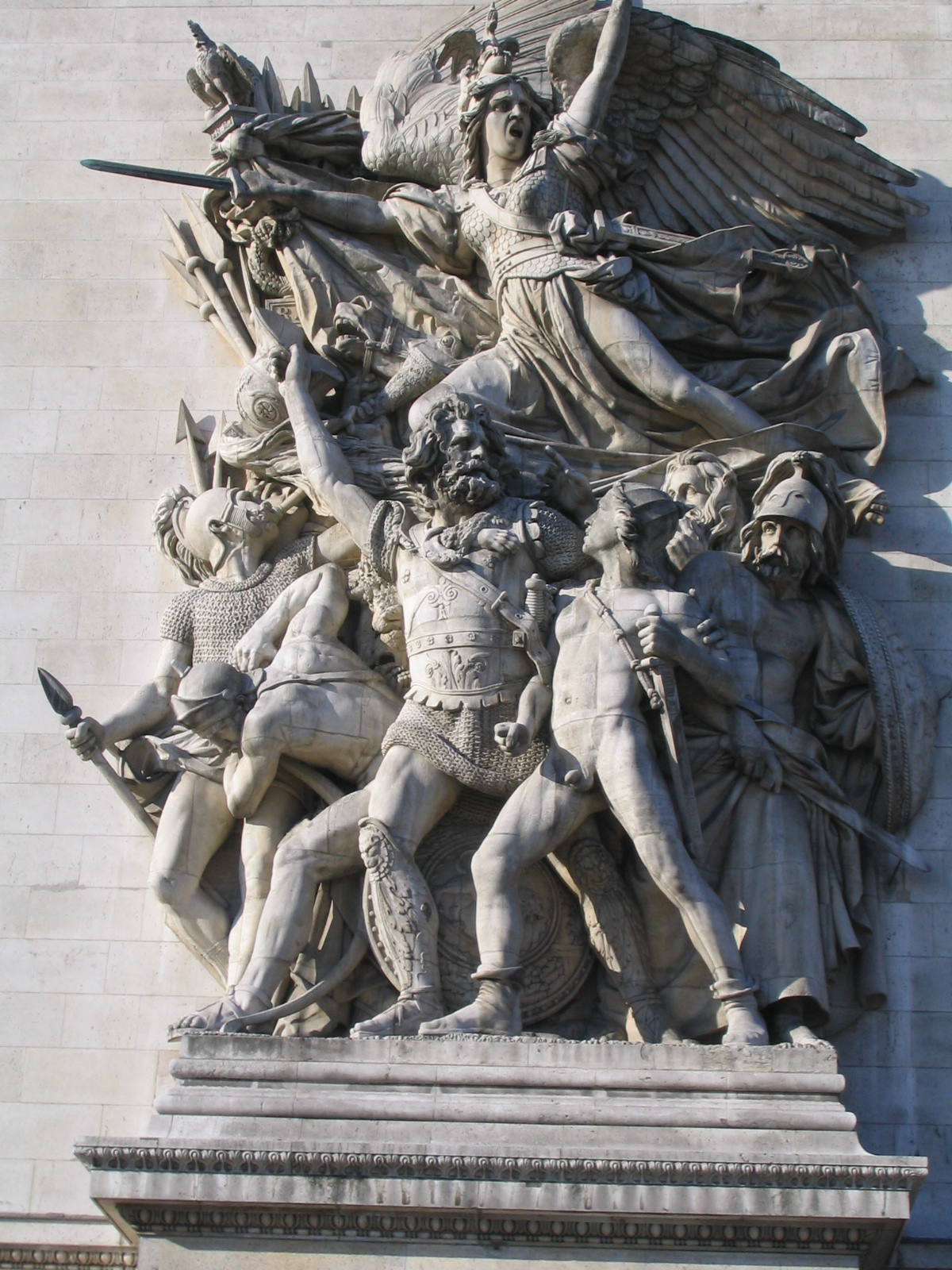
La Marseillaise by François Rude, on the Arc de Triomphe (1836)

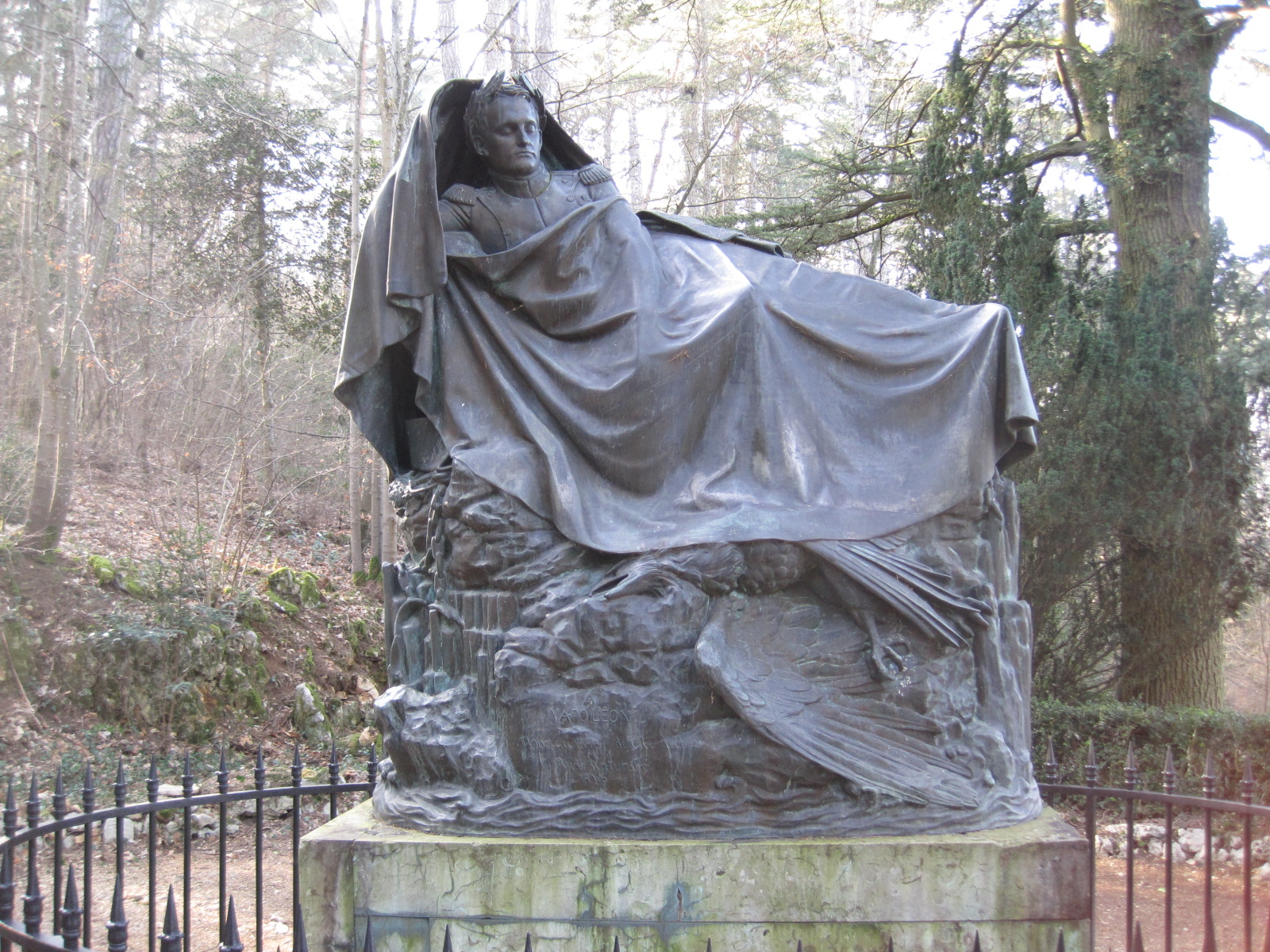
Napoleon Awakening to Immortality by François Rude (1845–47), Parc Noisot, Fixin-les-Dijon

The most prominent sculptor of the Louis Philippe style was the Swiss-born James Pradier, who made one of the most important monumental works of the period, a group of statues of The Victories that surround the tomb of Napoleon Bonaparte. He also made other neoclassical works that often approached eroticism and romanticism. Gustave Flaubert wrote of him: "This is a great artist, a true Greek, the most antique of all the moderns; a man who is distracted by nothing, not by politics, nor socialism, and who, like a true workman, sleeves rolled up, is there to do his task morning til night with the will to do well and the love of his art." He was largely forgotten after the Louis Philippe period.

Another notable sculptor from the older generation was David d'Angers (1788-1856) who had studied with Jacques-Louis David. He worked largely in an expressive neoclassical style, illustrated in his statue of Philopoemen hurt (1837), now in the Louvre.

Other sculptors with more enduring fame were François Rude, who made his celebrated La Marseillaise sculpture (formally known as The departure of the volunteers), a ten-meter high bas-relief for the Arc de Triomphe (1833–36), a project begun by Napoleon and completed by Louis Philippe. Rude also made the romantic Napoleon awakening to immortality in 1845–47. This illustrated popular movement to restore the reputation of Napoleon and the revolutionary spirit, which had been suppressed under the Restoration, but which reappeared with the return of the ashes of Napoleon to France under Louis Philippe. The Napoleonic spirit emerged triumphant in the 1848 Revolution, and the election of Louis Napoleon as the first President of France.

== Painting ==
Liberty Leading the People by Eugène Delacroix (1830), the Louvre

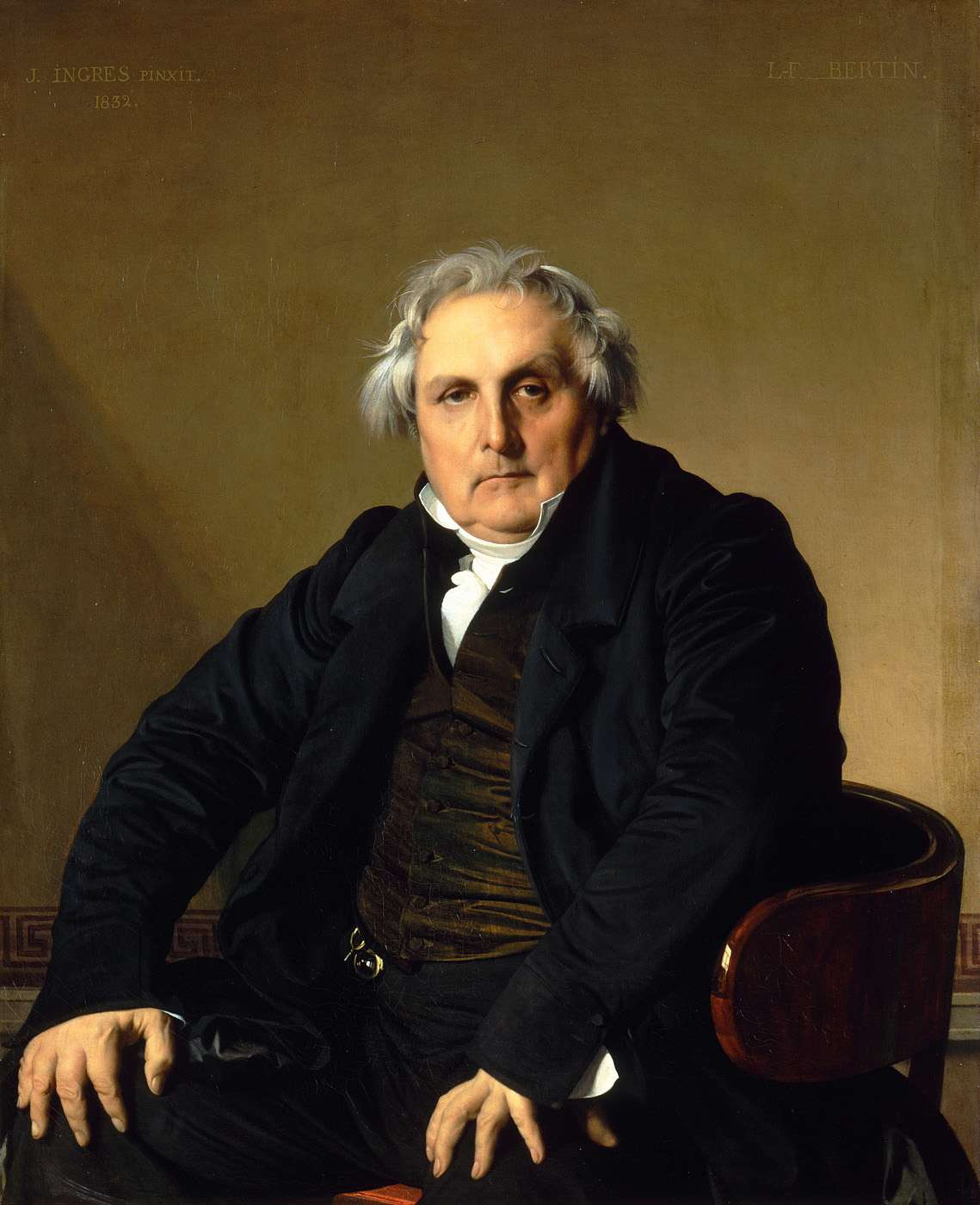
Portrait of Louis-François Bertin, by Jean-Auguste-Dominique Ingres (1832), the Louvre

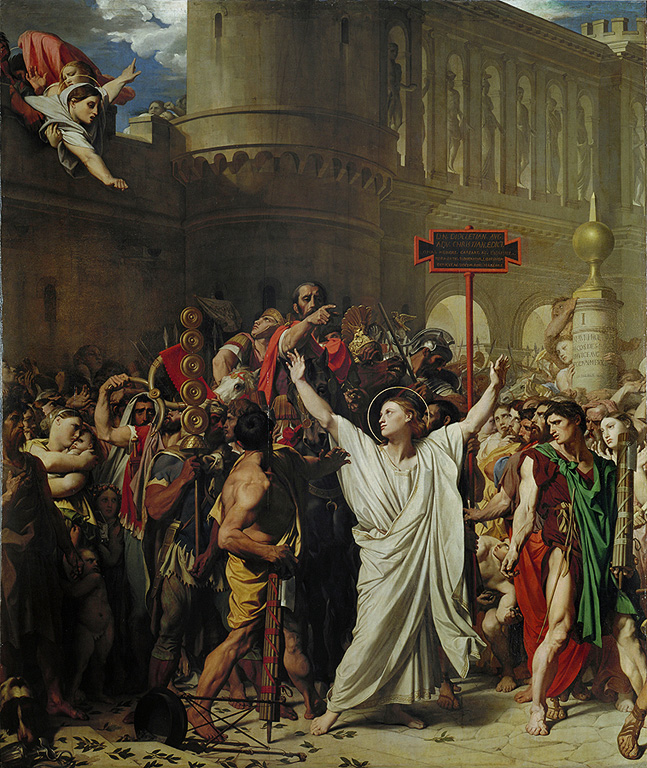
The Martyrdom of Saint-Symphorien by Jean-Auguste-Dominique Ingres (1834)

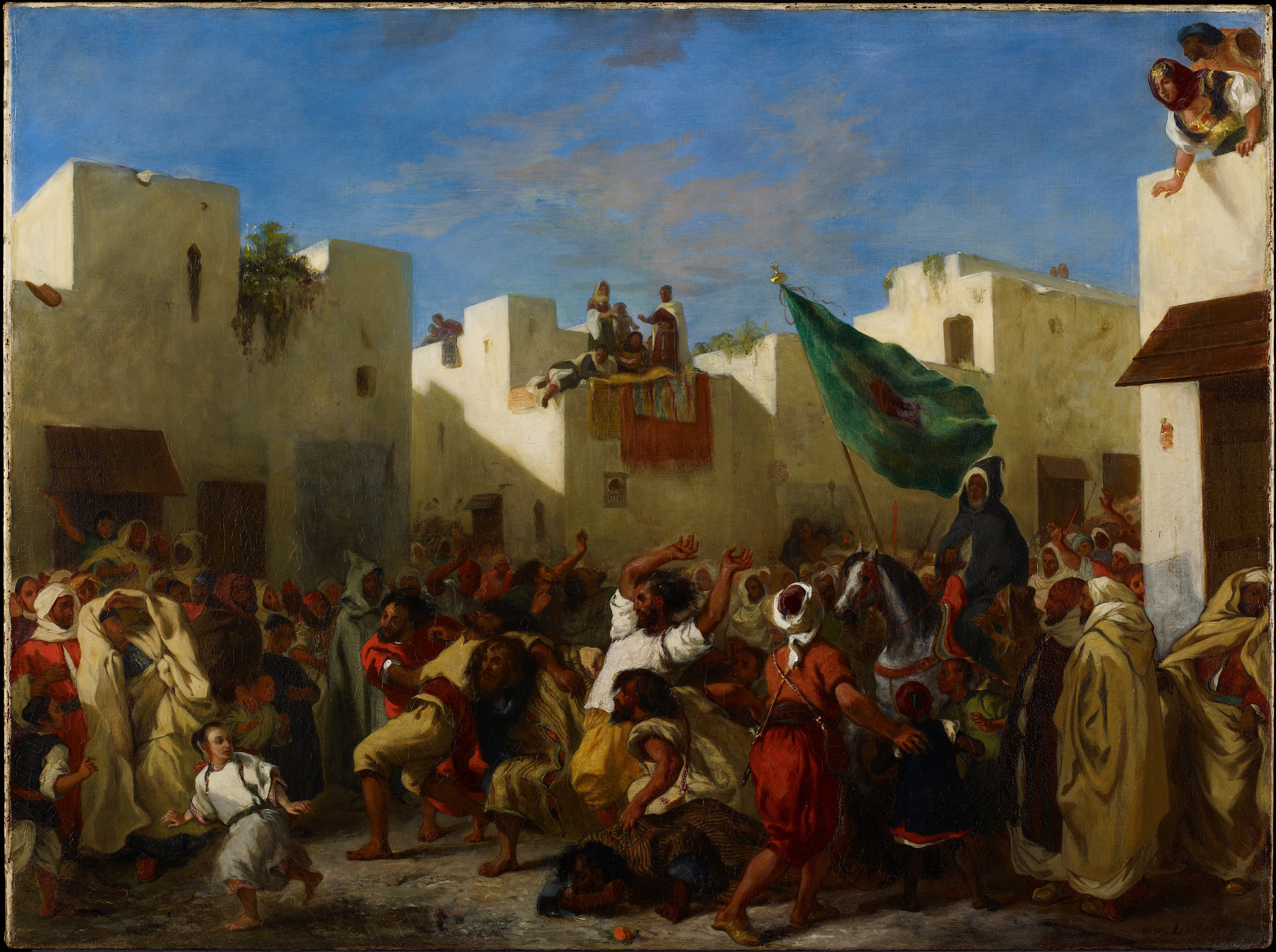
The Fanatics of Tangier by Eugène Delacroix (1838), Minneapolis Institute of Art

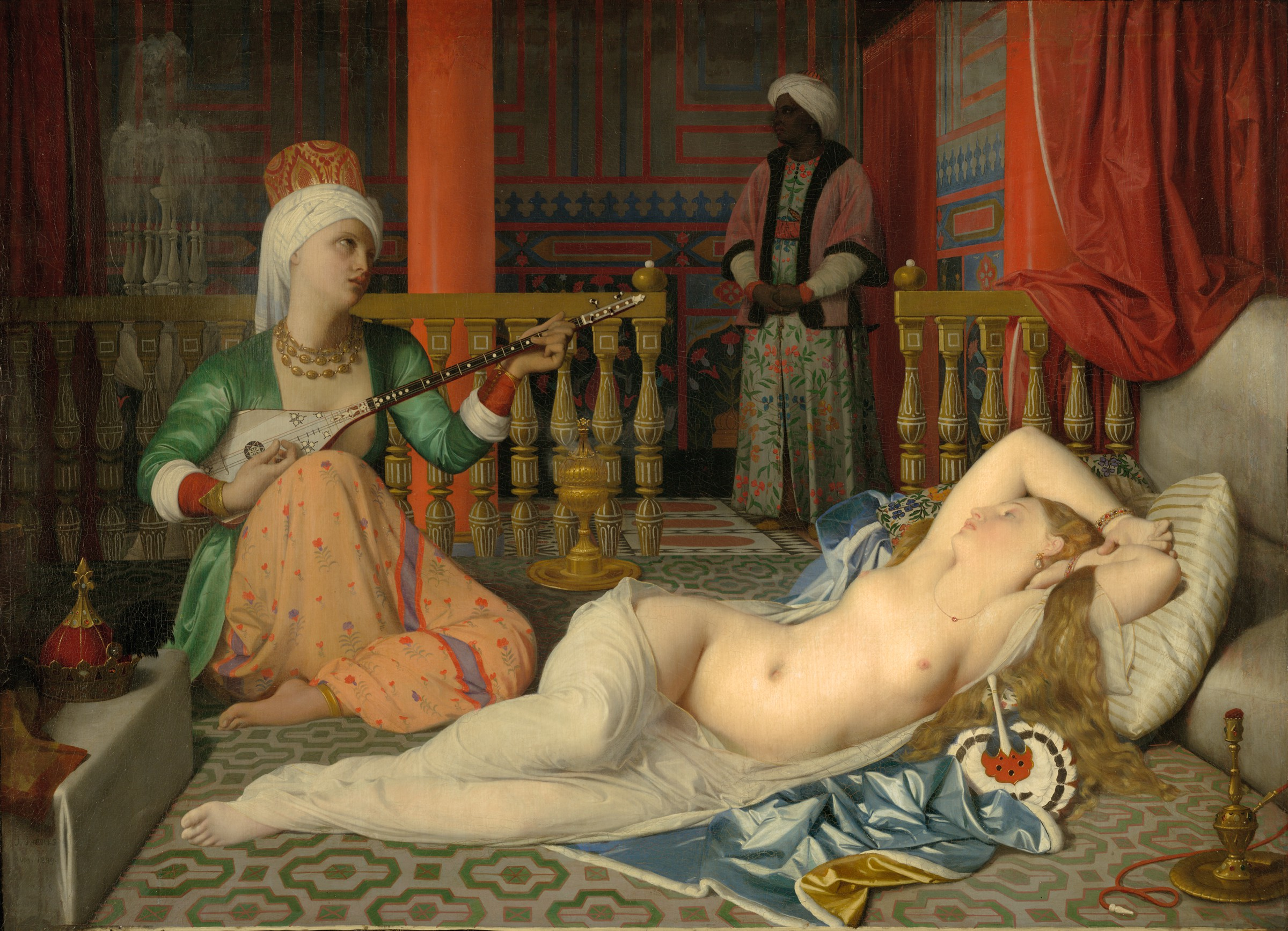
Odalisque and Slave by Jean-Auguste-Dominique Ingres (1843), Fogg Art Museum

The two most important painters of the Louis Philippe period, Eugène Delacroix and Jean-Auguste-Dominique Ingres were completely opposite in style, philosophy and temperament; Delacroix, the champion of romanticism, painted his celebrated Liberty Leading the People in 1830, shortly after the 1830 revolution that brought Louis Philippe to power, personifying the figure of Liberté as a bare-breasted classical goddess in the baroque style. The painting was acquired by the government of Louis Philippe for the Luxembourg Palace, but was soon returned to the painter because of its controversial political message, and was not shown again in public again until 1855, under Louis Napoleon. Thereafter it entered the collection of the Louvre.

Ingres was the champion of the French neoclassical style, and in addition the master of the portrait. However, his Martyrdom of Saint-Symphorien in 1834 was very badly received by French critics, who preferred Delacroix, and he departed Paris in disgust to become director of the French Academy in Rome, where he remained until 1841. In Rome he painted the first of his Odalisque paintings, scenes of slaves in Turkish baths.

From 1833 onwards, Delacroix received major commissions to decorate government buildings in Paris. In 1833 he began work for the Salon du Roi in the Chambre des Députés, Palais Bourbon, which was not completed until 1837, For the next ten years he painted in both the Library at the Palais Bourbon and the Library at the Palais du Luxembourg. In 1843 he decorated the Church of Saint-Denys-du-Saint-Sacrement with a large Pietà.

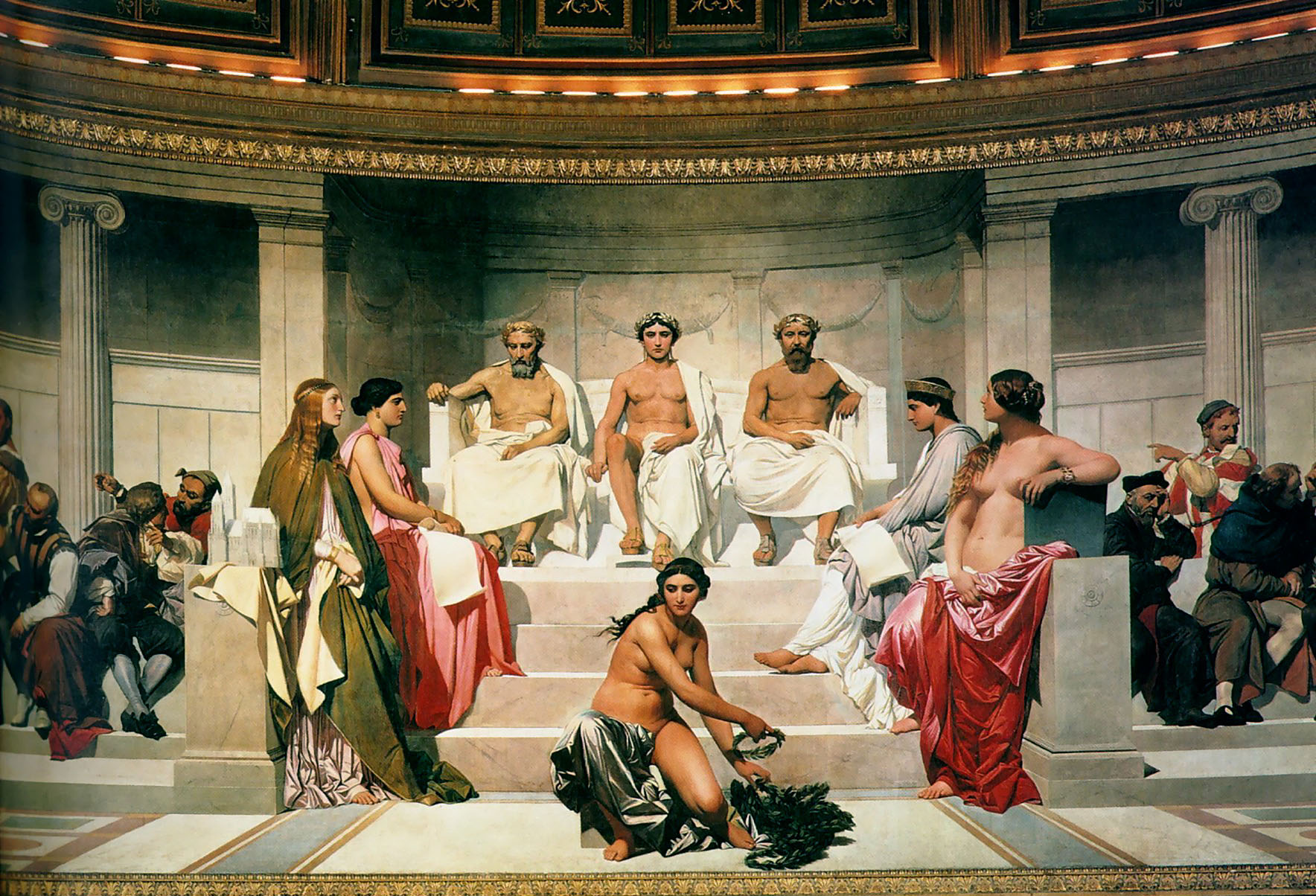
Central section of the École des Beaux Arts mural of all artists of history by Paul Delaroche (1837)

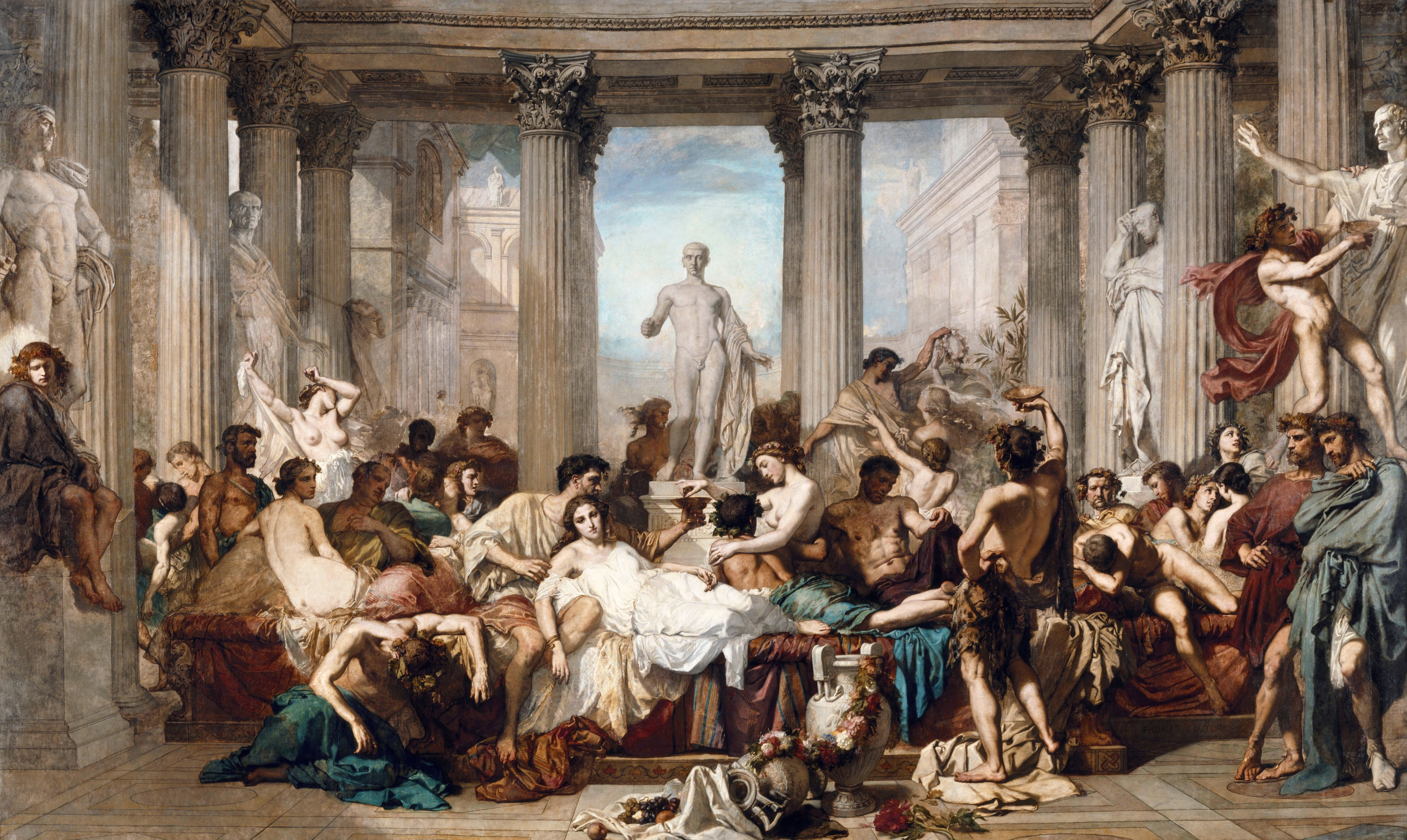
The Romans in Their Decadence by Thomas Couture

None of the other painters of the Louis Philippe era had the ability or status of Ingres or Delacroix, but they did have great ambitions. They included Paul Delaroche (1797-1856), a classicist in the Ingres tradition, who painted ceiling murals for the redecoration of Louvre in 1831, and for the murals of the hemicycle of the École des Beaux Arts in 1837, which included the sixty-six most famous painters since antiquity. He was considered the dean of historical paintings, specializing in executions and martyrdoms. Another notable painter of the period was Thomas Couture (1815-1879), a student of Antoine-Jean Gros, a muralist in the style called "Theatrical Romanticism". He received a commission for an eight-meter long painting for the Luxembourg Palace, titled "The Romans in their decadence". The finished painting borrowed from the old masters, the classicists, and the romantics, crowding dozens of figures into a single canvas depicting Roman decadence.

== Literature ==
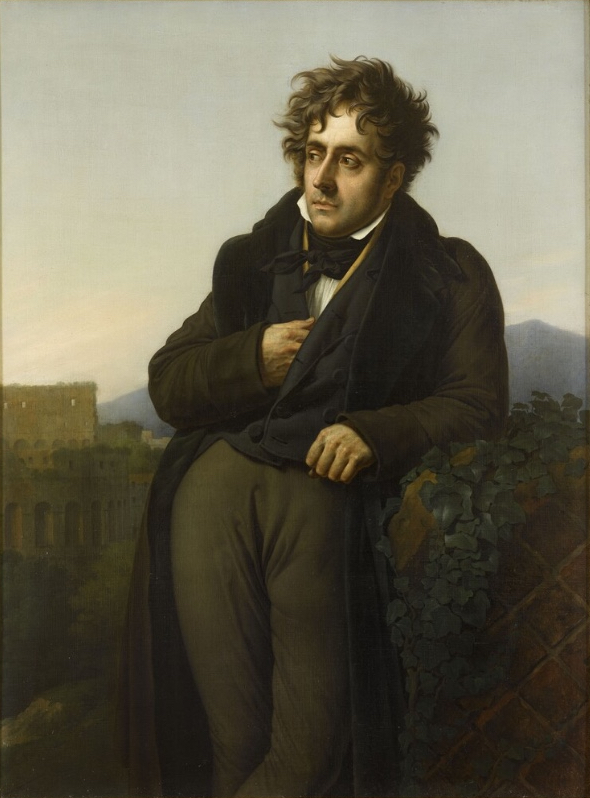
Chateaubriand

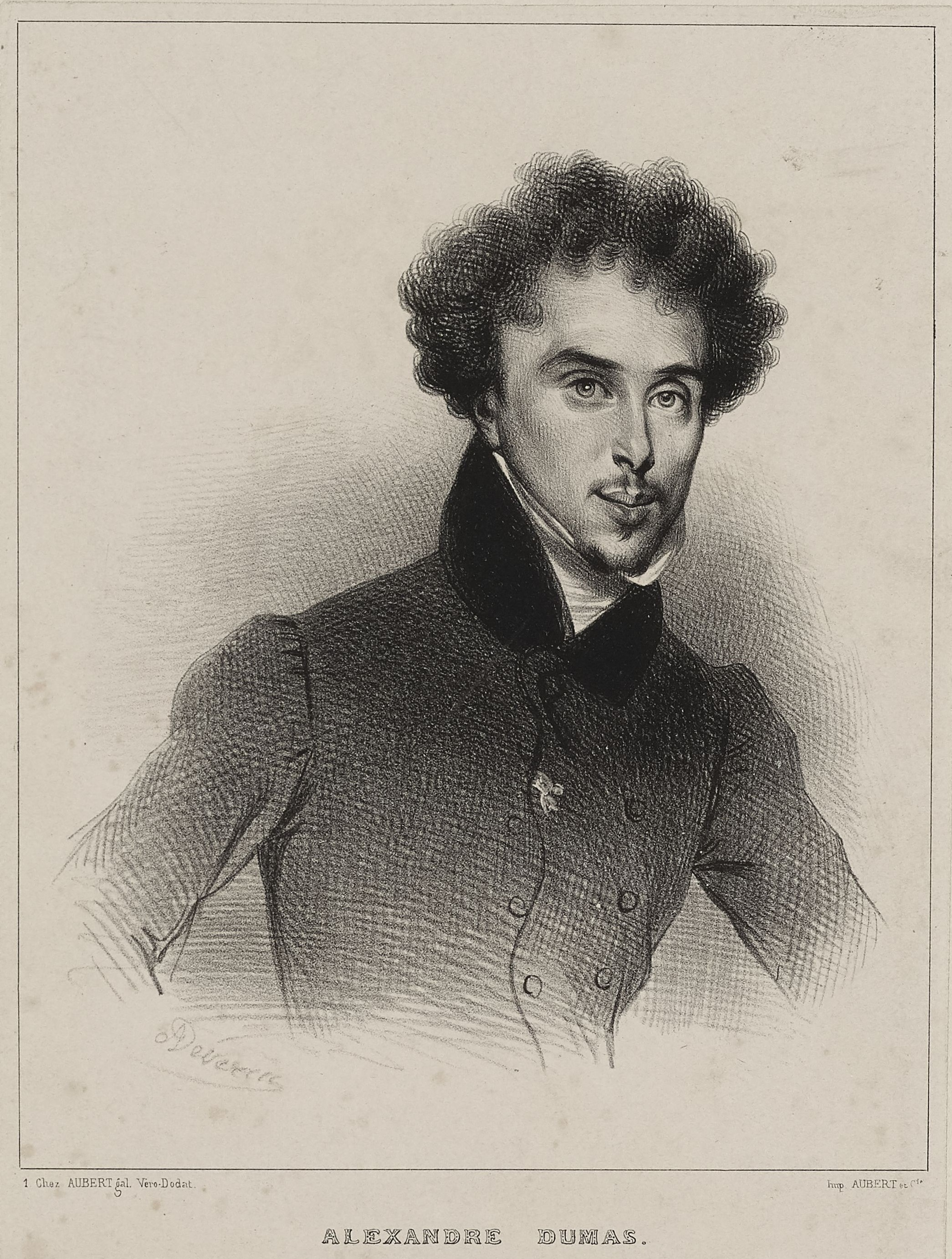
Alexandre Dumas, père (1832)

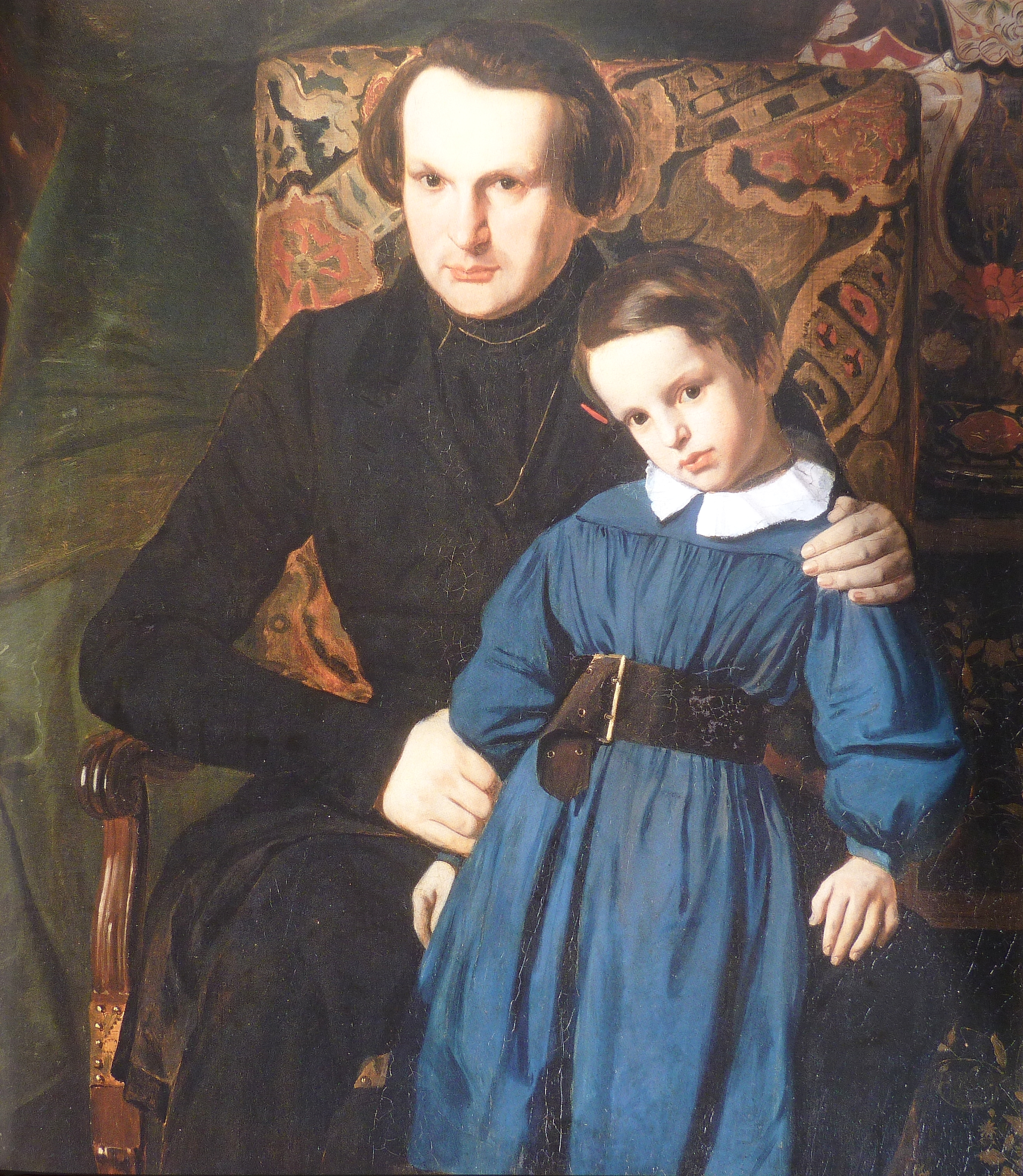
Victor Hugo and his son François-Victor (1836)

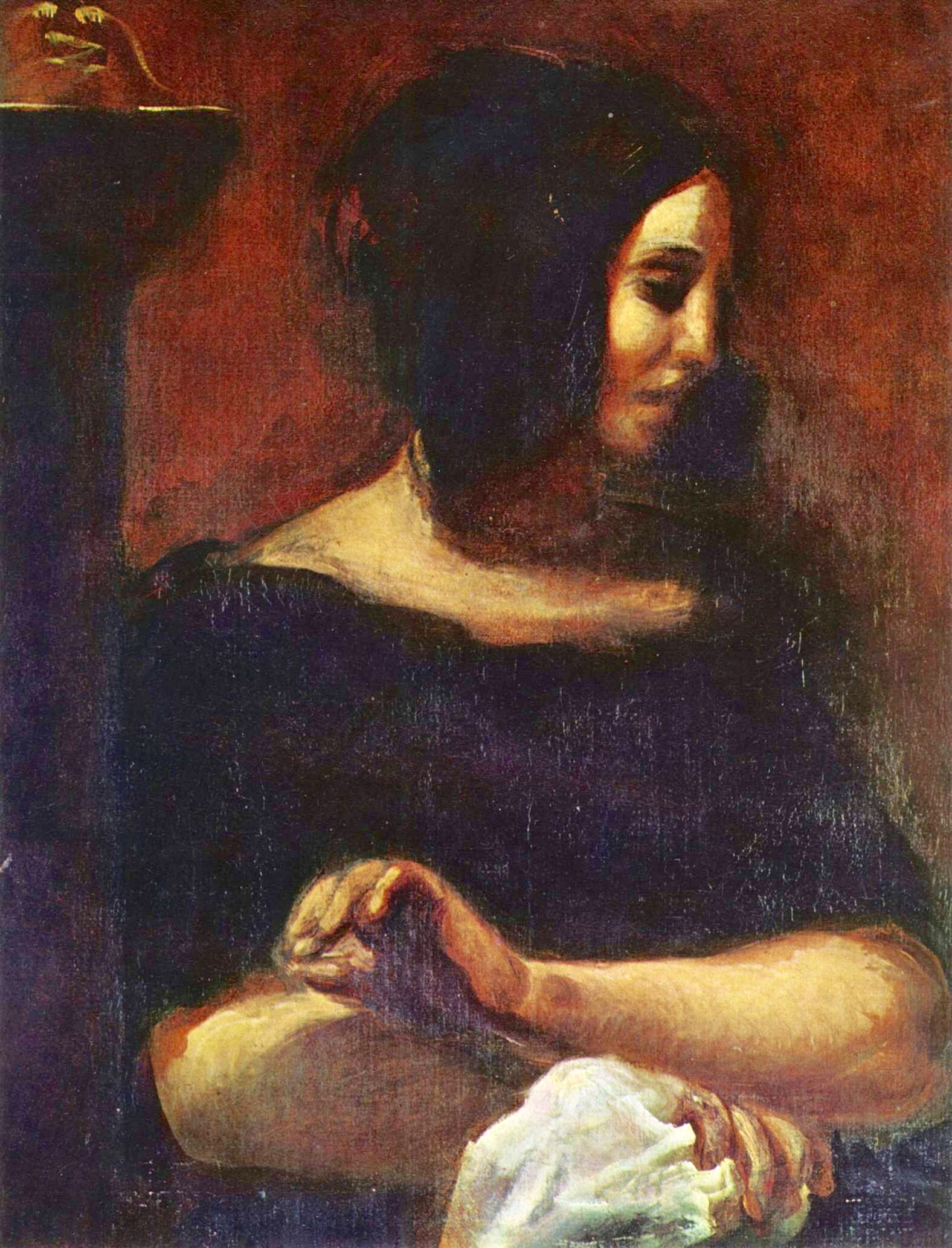
George Sand by Eugène Delacroix (1837)

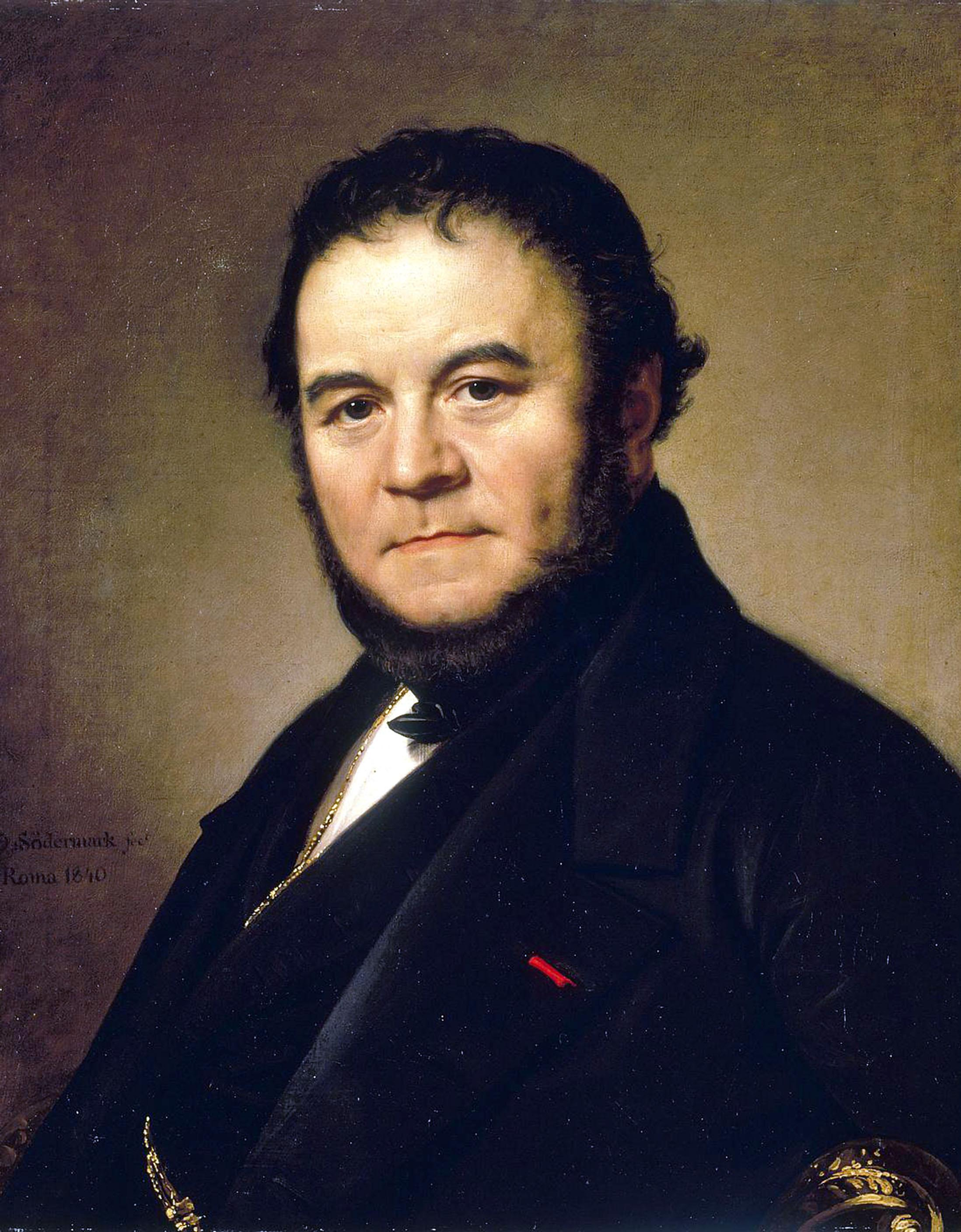
Stendhal (1840)

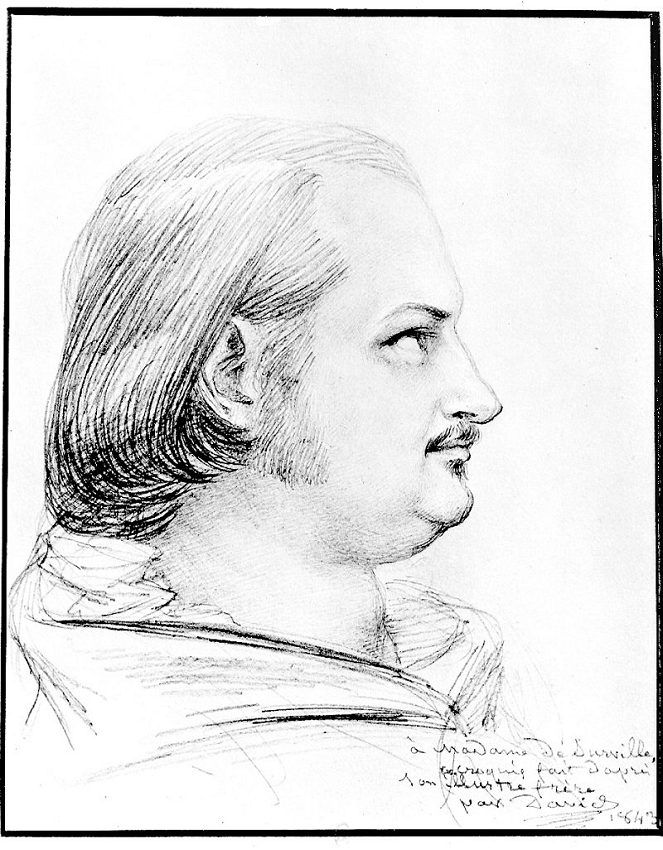
Honoré de Balzac (1843)

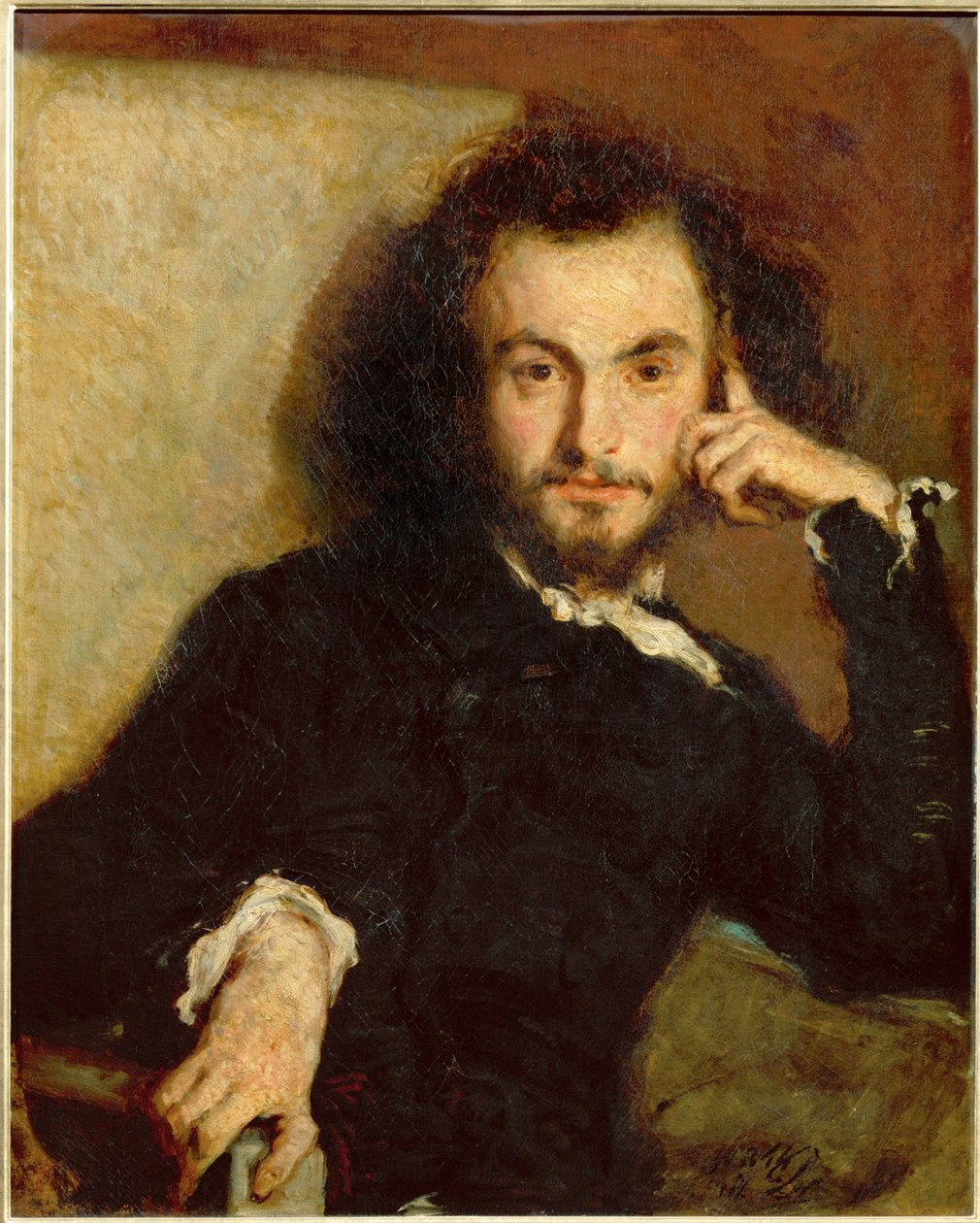
Charles Baudelaire (1844)

The reign of Louis Philippe was a golden age for French literature; many of France's most famous writers published major works. The movement of romanticism became dominant in French literature.

Victor Hugo published four volumes of poetry, and in 1831 published Notre-Dame de Paris (The Hunchback of Notre-Dame), which was quickly translated into English and other European languages. The novel led to the restoration of the cathedral and other medieval monuments in Paris. In 1841, Louis-Philippe made Hugo a peer of France, a ceremonial position with a seat in the upper house of the French parliament. Hugo spoke out against the death penalty and for freedom of speech. While living in his house on the Place Royale (now Place des Vosges), he began working on his next novel, Les Misérables.

François-René de Chateaubriand refused to swear allegiance to Louis-Philippe, and instead secluded himself in his apartment at 120 Rue du Bac and wrote his most famous work, Mémoires d'outre-tombe, which was not published until after his death. He died in Paris on 4 July 1848, during the French Revolution of 1848.

in 1832 Honoré de Balzac conceived the idea of a series of books that would paint a panoramic portrait of "all aspects of society;" eventually called La Comédie Humaine. He declared to his sister, "I am about to become a genius." He published Eugénie Grandet, his first bestseller, in 1833, followed by Le Père Goriot in 1835, the two-volume Illusions perdues in 1843, Splendeurs et misères des courtisanes in 1847, Le Cousin Pons (1847) and La Cousine Bette (1848). In each of the novels, Paris is the setting and a major participant.

Alexandre Dumas published The Three Musketeers (1844); Twenty Years After (1845); The Vicomte de Bragelonne (1847); The Count of Monte Cristo (1845–1846); La Reine Margot (1845); La Dame de Monsoreau (1846); and many more novels, in addition to many theatrical versions of his novels for the Paris stage.

Stendhal published his first major novel, Le Rouge et le Noir, in 1830, and his second, La Chartreuse de Parme, in 1839.

Other major Paris writers who produced important works included George Sand, Alfred de Musset, and Alphonse de Lamartine. The poet Charles Baudelaire, born in Paris, published his first works, essays of art criticism.

== Music ==
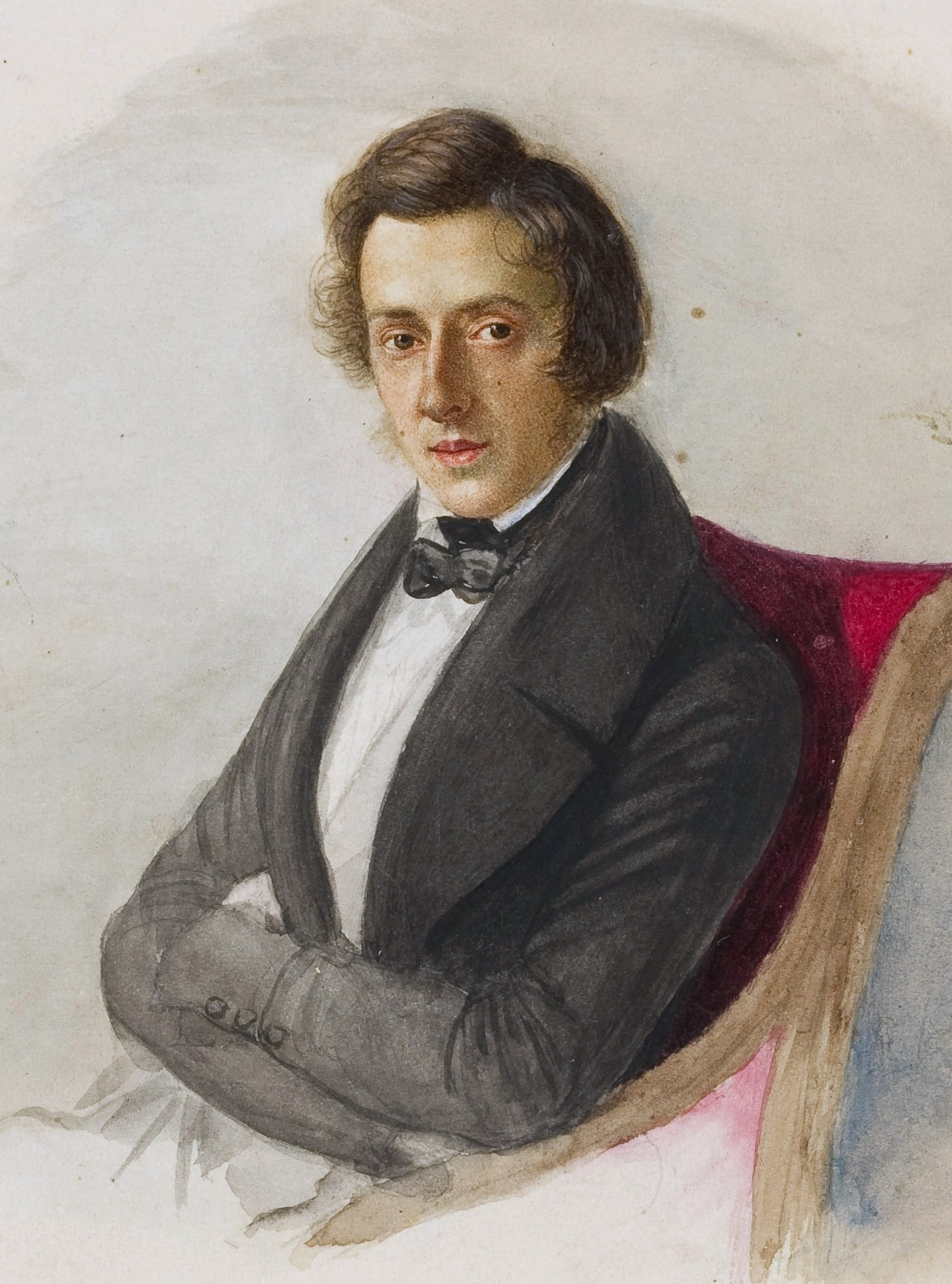
Frédéric Chopin by Maria Wodzińska (1836)

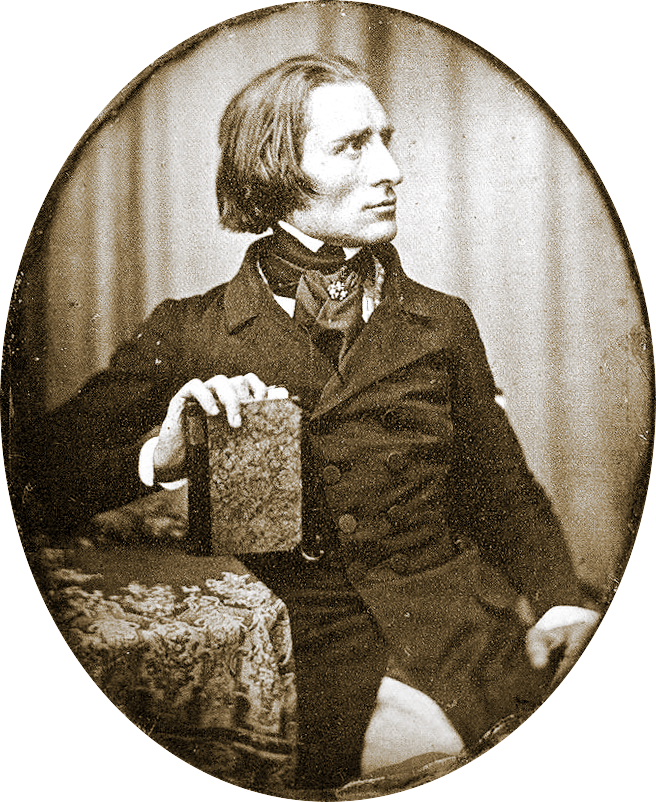
Franz Liszt (1843)

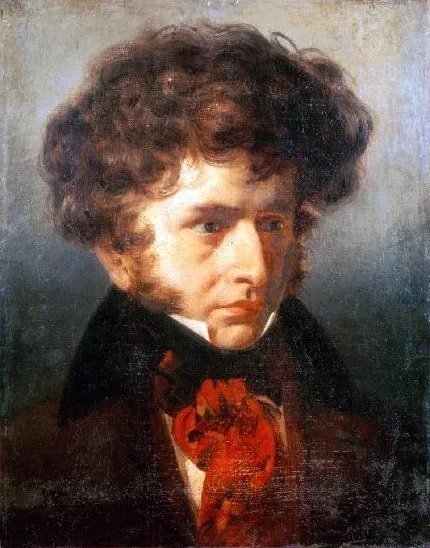
Hector Berlioz, by Émile Signol (1832)

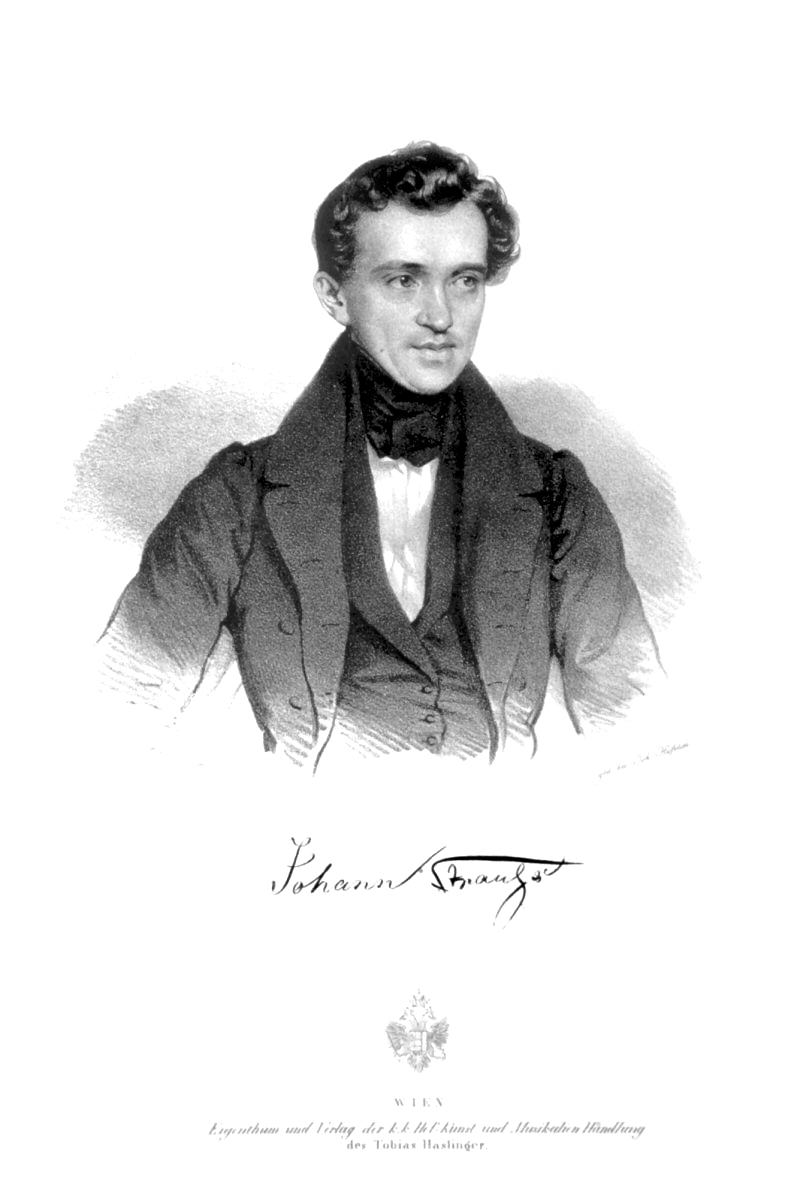
Johann Strauss I (1835)

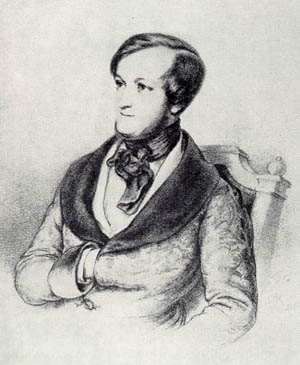
Richard Wagner (1840)

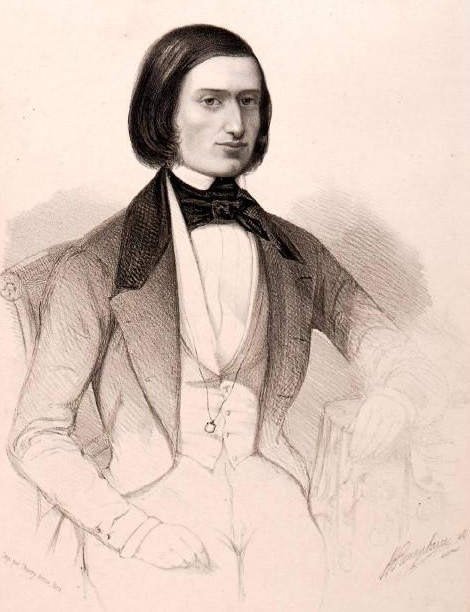
Jacques Offenbach (1840s)

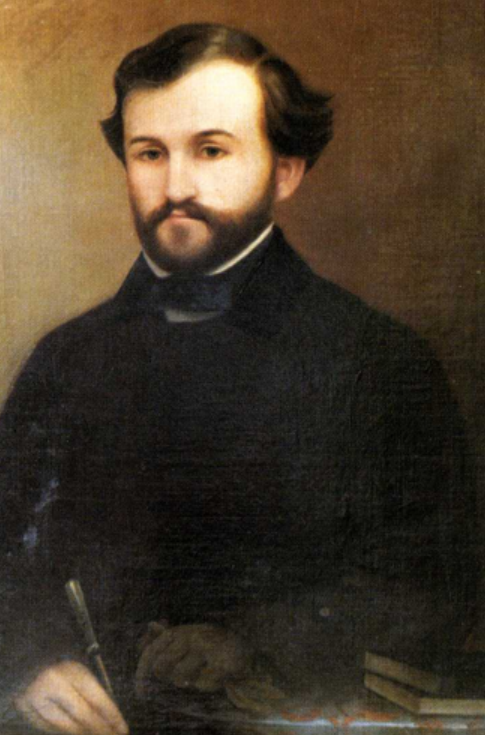
Verdi in 1840s

Paris was the musical capital of Europe between 1830 and 1848. It was the home of Chopin, Liszt, Richard Wagner, Berlioz, and Verdi at various times during the period. Romanticism was unchallenged as the dominant movement. Music played an important part in the regime from the very beginning, during the 1830 revolution that overthrew Charles X. The famed tenor Adolphe Nourrit, who had starred in the operas of Rossini, went onto the stages of Paris and emotionally sang the Marseillaise, which had been forbidden during the First Empire and the Restoration.

The most famous musical exile in Paris was Frédéric Chopin, who arrived in September 1831 at the age of twenty-one, and did not return to Congress Poland because of the crushing of the Polish uprising against Russian rule in November 1831. Chopin gave his first concert in Paris at the Salle Pleyel on 26 February 1832, and remained in the city for most of the next eighteen years. He gave just thirty public performances during these years, preferring to give recitals in private salons. On 16 February 1838 and on 2 December 1841, he played at the Tuileries for King Louis Philippe and the royal family. (He also gave a recital for the royal family in October 1839 in the Château de Saint-Cloud). He earned his living from commissions given by wealthy patrons, including the wife of James Mayer de Rothschild, from publishing his compositions and giving private lessons.

Franz Liszt also lived in Paris during this period, composing music for the piano and giving concerts and music lessons. The two men were friends, but Chopin did not appreciate the manner in which Liszt played variations on his music. Liszt wrote in 1837 in La Revue et Gazette musicale de Paris: "Paris is the pantheon of living musicians, the temple where one becomes a god for a century or for an hour; the burning fire which lights and then consumes all fame." The violinist Niccolò Paganini was a frequent visitor and performer in Paris. In 1836, he made an unfortunate investment in a Paris casino, and went bankrupt. He was forced to sell his collection of violins to pay his debts. Richard Wagner came to Paris in 1839, hoping to present his works on the Paris opera stages, with no success. Some interest was finally shown by the director of the Paris Opera; he rejected Wagner's music but wanted to buy the synopsis of his opera, Le Vaissau fantôme, to be put to music by a French composer, Louis-Philippe Dietsch. Wagner sold the work for five hundred francs, and returned home in 1842.

Of the French composers during the period Hector Berlioz was the most prominent. He had come to Paris from Grenoble in 1821 to study medicine, which he abandoned for music in 1824, attending the Conservatory in 1826, and won the Prix de Rome for his compositions in 1830. He was working on his most famous work, the Symphonie Fantastique, at the time of the July 1830 revolution. It had its premiere on 4 December 1830.

Three Paris theaters were permitted to produce operas under Louis Philippe: The Royal Academy of Music at the Salle Le Peletier; the Opéra-Comique; and the Théâtre-Italien, nicknamed "Les Bouffes". The Royal Academy, financed by the government, was in dire financial difficulties. In February, the government handed over management of the theater to a gifted entrepreneur, Doctor Louis-Désiré Véron, who had become wealthy selling medicinal ointments. Véron targeted the audience of the newly wealthy Parisian businessmen and entrepreneurs; he redesigned the theater to make the loges smaller (six seats reduced to four seats), installed gas lights to improve visibility, and launched a new repertoire to make the Paris Opera "both brilliant and popular". The first great success of the new regime was Robert le Diable by the German composer Giacomo Meyerbeer, which premiered on November 21, 1831. Meyerbeer wrote a succession of popular operas. At the end of his four-year contract, Doctor Véron retired, leaving the opera in an admirable financial and artistic position.

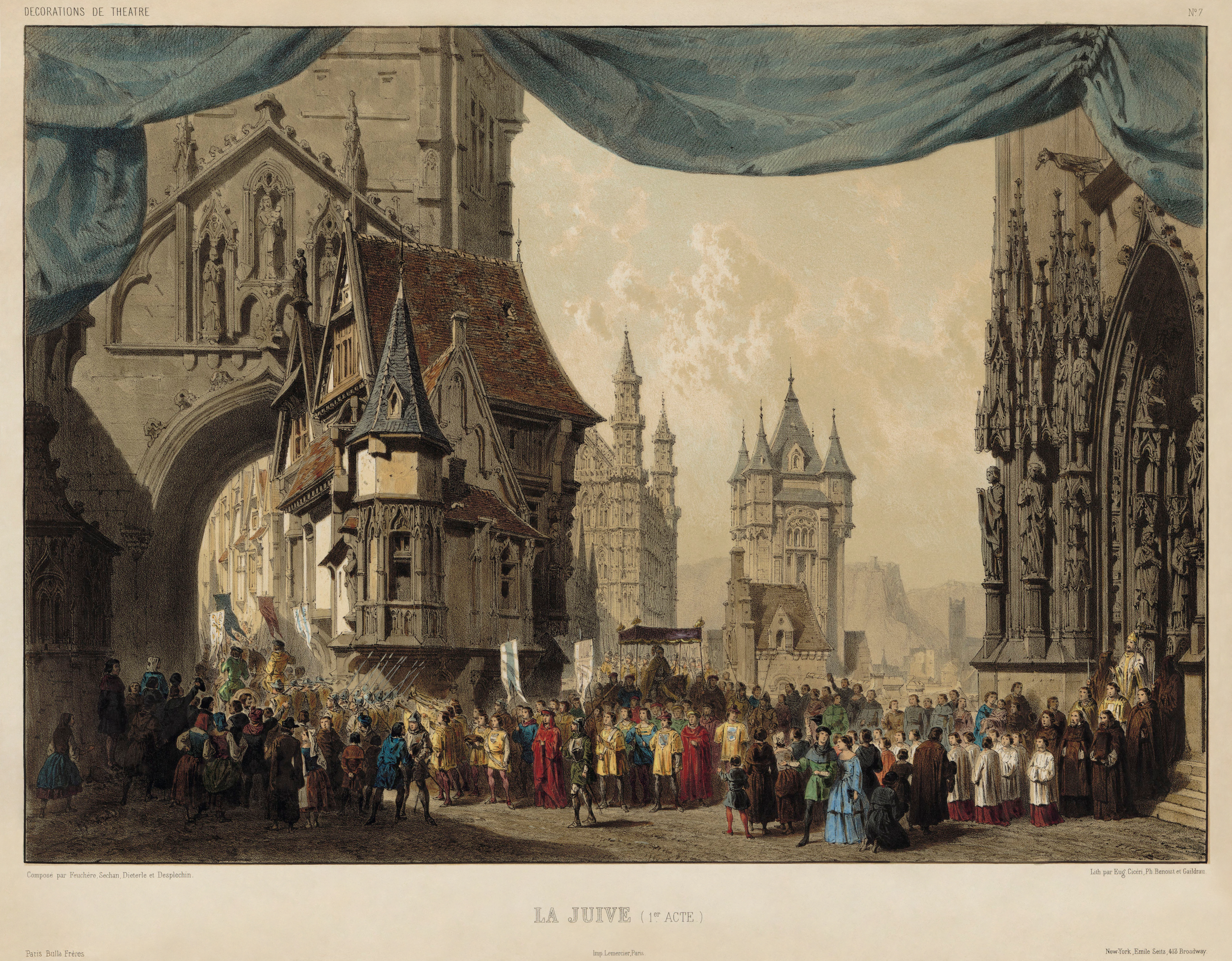
Set for Act 1 of La Juive at the Opéra-Comique (1835)

The Opéra-Comique also enjoyed great success, largely due to the talents of the scenarist Eugène Scribe, who wrote ninety works for the theater, put to music by forty different composers, including Daniel Auber, Giacomo Meyerbeer, Fromental Halévy (La Juive (1835)), Cherubini, Donizetti, Gounod and Verdi (for whom he wrote Les vêpres siciliennes). Scribe left behind the grand mythological themes of earlier French opera, and wrote stories from a variety of historical periods which, with a mixture of strong emotion, humor and romanticism, exactly suited the taste of Parisian audiences.

The Théâtre-Italien completed the grand trio of Paris opera houses. After the fire at the Salle Favart, it moved briefly to the Odéon Theater and then permanently to the Salle Ventadour. In their repertoire, the ballet played a very small part, the costumes and sets were not remarkable, and the number of works was small; only a dozen new operas were staged between 1825 and 1870; but they included several famous works of Bel Canto opera, including I Puritani by Bellini and Marino Faliero and Don Pasquale by Donizetti. Verdi lived primarily in Paris between 1845 and 1847, and staged four of his operas at the Théâtre-Italien: Nabucco, Ernani, I due Foscari, and Jérusalem. The leading Italian singers also came regularly to sing at the Théâtre-Italien, including Giovanni Rubini, the creator of the role of Arturo in Bellini's I Puritani, Giulia Grisi, Fanny Persiani, Henriette Sontag and Giuditta Pasta, who created the role of Norma in Bellini's opera.

French composers including Hector Berlioz struggled in vain against the tide of Italian operas. Berlioz succeeded in getting his opera Benvenuto Cellini staged at the Royal Academy in 1838, but it closed after just three performances, and was not staged again in France during his lifetime. Berlioz complained in the Journal des débats that there were six operas by Donizetti in Paris playing in one year. "Monsieur Donizetti has the air to treat us like a conquered country," he wrote, "it is a veritable war of invasion. We can no longer call them the lyric theaters of Paris, just the lyric theaters of Monsieur Donizetti."

With the growing popularity of classical music and the arrival of so many talented musicians, Paris encountered a shortage of concert halls. The best hall in the city was that of the Conservatoire de Paris on rue Bergére, which had excellent acoustics and could seat a thousand persons. Berlioz premiered his Symphonie Fantastique there on December 30, 1830; on December 29, 1832, Berlioz presented the Symphony again, along with two new pieces, Lelio and Harold en Italie, which he wrote specially for Paganini to play. At the end of the performance, with Victor Hugo and Alexandre Dumas in the audience, Paganini bowed down humbly before Berlioz in tribute.

The Concert Society of the Paris Conservatory was founded in 1828, especially to play the symphonies of Beethoven – one at each performance, along with works by Mozart, Hayden and Handel. It was the first professional symphonic association in Europe. A second symphony association, the Societé de Sainte-Cecile, was founded shortly afterwards, which played more modern music; it presented the Paris premieres of Wagner's Tannhäuser overture, works by Schubert, the Symphonie Italienne of Mendelssohn, the Fuite en Égypte of Berlioz, and the first works of Charles Gounod and Georges Bizet.

== Ballet and dance ==
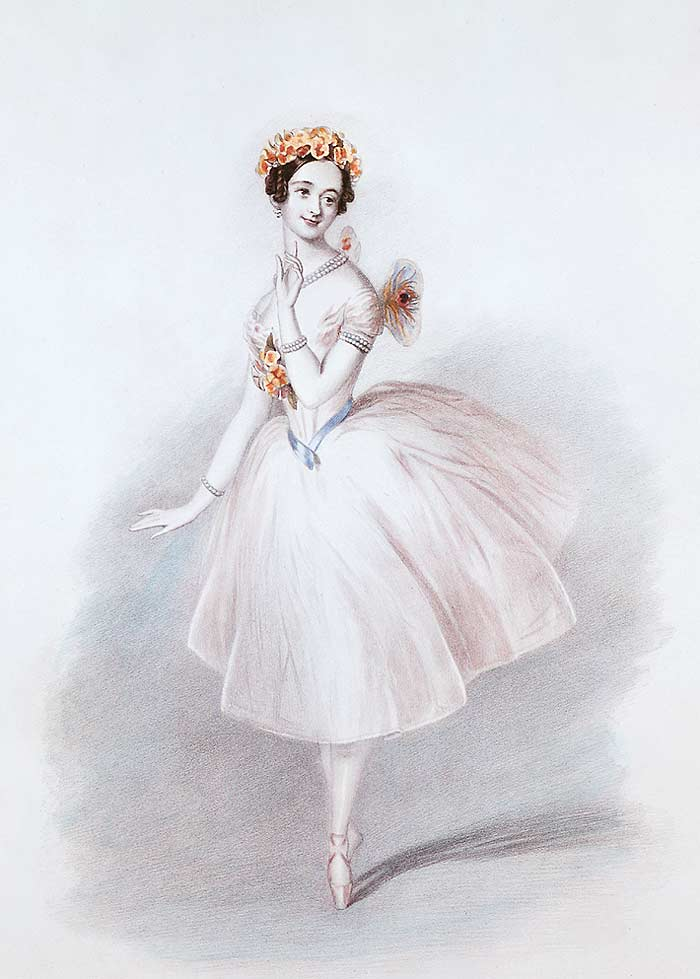
Marie Taglioni in La Sylphide (1832)

The ballet had been an integral part of the Paris Opera since the time of Louis XIV the 17th century. A new style, Romantic ballet, was born on March 12, 1832, with the premiere of La Sylphide at the Salle Le Peletier, with choreography by Filippo Taglioni and music by Jean-Madeleine Schneitzhoeffer. Taglioni designed the work as a showcase for his daughter Marie. La Sylphide was the first ballet where dancing en pointe had an aesthetic rationale and was not merely an acrobatic stunt. Other romantic ballets that had their first performances at the Opera were Giselle (1841), Paquita (1846) and Le Corsaire (1856). Among the great ballerinas to grace the stage of the Opéra during this time were Marie Taglioni, Carlotta Grisi, Carolina Rosati, Fanny Elssler, Lucile Grahn, and Fanny Cerrito.

Lucien Petipa danced the male lead in Giselle at its premiere, and his younger brother Marius Petipa also danced for a time at the Paris Opera. Marius Petipa moved from Paris to Saint Petersburg, where he became the ballet-master for the Russian Imperial ballet and created many celebrated ballets, including The Sleeping Beauty, La Bayadère and The Nutcracker.

== Balls, concerts-promenades and the romance ==
The Champs-Élysées was redeveloped in the 1830s with public gardens at either end, and became a popular place for Parisians to promenade. It was soon lined with restaurants, cafes-chantants. and pleasure gardens where outdoor concerts and balls were held. The Café Turc opened a garden with a series of concert-promenades in the spring of 1833, which alternated symphonic music with quadrilles and airs for dancing. The 17-year-old Jacques Offenbach wrote his first compositions for the dance orchestra at the Café Turc. The Tivoli, the Bazar of rue Saint-Honoré and the Casino Paganini competed with the Café Turc. In 1837, the King of the Viennese waltz, Johann Strauss I, came in person to in Paris, competing with the French waltz king, Philippe Musard. The outdoor concerts and balls did not stay in fashion for long; most of the gardens began to close after 1838, and Musard took charge instead of the famous masked balls at the Paris Opera. The romance, a song with a simple, tender melody, sentimental words, accompanied on the piano, became the fashion in the Paris salons. Thousands of copies were sold by Paris publishers.

== Street music, goguettes and the cabaret ==
At the beginning of the 1830s, the Paris police counted 271 wandering street musicians, 220 saltimbanques, 106 players of the barbary organ, and 135 itinerant street singers. The goguettes, or working class singing clubs, continued to grow in popularity, meeting in the back rooms of cabarets. The repertoire of popular songs ranged from romantic to comic and satirical, to political and revolutionary, especially in the 1840s. In June 1848 the musical clubs were banned from meeting, as the government tried, without success, to stop the political unrest, which finally exploded into the 1848 French Revolution.

== Bibliography ==
- De Morant, Henry (1970). Histoire des arts décoratifs. Librarie Hacahette.
- Droguet, Anne (2004). Les Styles Transition et Louis XVI. Les Editions de l'Amateur. ISBN 2-85917-406-0.
- Ducher, Robert (1988), Caractéristique des Styles, Paris: Flammarion, ISBN 2-08-011539-1
- Fierro, Alfred (1996). Histoire et dictionnaire de Paris. Robert Laffont. ISBN 2-221--07862-4.
- Héron de Villefosse, René (1959). Histoire de Paris. Bernard Grasset.
- Prina, Francesca; Demartini, Elena (2006). Petite encylopédie de l'architecture. Paris: Solar. ISBN 2-263-04096-X.
- Hopkins, Owen (2014). Les styles en architecture. Dunod. ISBN 978-2-10-070689-1.
- Renault, Christophe (2006), Les Styles de l'architecture et du mobilier, Paris: Gisserot, ISBN 978-2-877-4746-58
- Riley, Noël (2004), Grammaire des Arts Décoratifs de la Renaissance au Post-Modernisme, Flammarion, ISBN 978-2-080-1132-76
- Sarmant, Thierry (2012). Histoire de Paris: Politique, urbanisme, civilisation. Editions Jean-Paul Gisserot. ISBN 978-2-755-803303.
- Texier, Simon (2012), Paris- Panorama de l'architecture de l'Antiquité à nos jours, Paris: Parigramme, ISBN 978-2-84096-667-8
- Toman, Rolf (2007). Néoclassicisme et Romantisme: architecture, sculpture, peinture, dessin (in French). Ullmann. ISBN 978-3-8331-3557-6.
- Dictionnaire Historique de Paris. Le Livre de Poche. 2013. ISBN 978-2-253-13140-3.
- Vila, Marie Christine (2007). Paris Musique- Huit Siècles d'histoire. Paris: Parigramme. ISBN 978-2-84096-419-3.
