= Flory =

Flory may refer to:

- Flory (surname)
- Flory Van Donck (1912–1992), Belgian golfer
- Flory Cirque, a cirque (valley) in Victoria Land, Antarctica
- Flory (heraldry), in heraldry

== See also ==
- Flory convention in chemistry
- Cross fleury, heraldic element
- Fleury (disambiguation)
- Fleurey (disambiguation)
- Florey (disambiguation)
- Florrie (disambiguation)
