= De Fleury =

De Fleury is a surname. Notable people with the surname include:

- André-Hercule de Fleury (1653–1743), chief minister of Louis XV of France, cardinal and Bishop of Fréjus
- Charles Rohault de Fleury (1801–1875), French architect
- François de Fleury (1749–1799), French officer who fought in the American Revolutionary War
- Georges Rohault de Fleury (1835–1904), French archaeologist and art historian
- Hubert Rohault de Fleury (architect) (1777–1846), French architect
- Hubert Rohault de Fleury (soldier) (1779–1866), French general
- Hubert Rohault de Fleury (painter) (1828–1910), French painter
- Joseph Omer Joly de Fleury (1715–1810), French opponent of the Encyclopédie, Jesuits and inoculation
- Maria De Fleury (fl. 1773–1791), London Baptist poet, hymnist and polemicist

== See also ==
- Fleury (name), a surname and given name
