= Rohault de Fleury =

Rohault de Fleury is a French family name. It may refer to:

- Charles Rohault de Fleury (1801–1875), French architect
- Georges Rohault de Fleury (1835–1904), French archaeologist and art historian
- Hubert Rohault de Fleury (architect) (1777–1846), French architect
- Hubert Rohault de Fleury (general) (1779–1866), French soldier
- Hubert Rohault de Fleury (painter) (1828–1910), French painter
