= Hubert Rohault de Fleury =

Hubert Rohault de Fleury may refer to:

- Hubert Rohault de Fleury (architect) (1777–1846), French architect
- Hubert Rohault de Fleury (soldier) (1779–1866), French soldier
- Hubert Rohault de Fleury (painter) (1828–1910), French painter
