= Fleury =

Fleury may refer to:

== People ==
- Fleury (name), a French and English name of Norman origin, including a list of people with the name
- De Fleury, a surname, including a list of people with the name
- Abraham-Joseph Bénard (1750–1822), known as Fleury, a French actor and comedian

== Places in France ==
=== Auvergne-Rhône-Alpes ===
- Fleury, Aisne

=== Bourgoigne-Franche-Comté ===
- Fleury-sur-Loire, Nièvre
- Fleury-la-Montagne, Saône-et-Loire
- Fleury-la-Vallée, Yonne

=== Centre-Val de Loire ===
- Fleury Abbey, in Saint-Benoît-sur-Loire, Loiret
- Fleury-les-Aubrais, Loiret

=== Grand Est ===
- Fleury-la-Rivière, Marne
- Fleury-devant-Douaumont, Meuse
- Fleury, Moselle

=== Hauts-de-France ===
- Fleury, Oise
- Fleury, Pas-de-Calais
- Fleury, Somme

=== Île-de-France ===
- Fleury-Mérogis, Essonne
- Fleury-en-Bière, Seine-et-Marne

=== Normandy ===
- Fleury-sur-Orne, Calvados
- Fleury-la-Forêt, Eure
- Fleury-sur-Andelle, Eure
- Fleury, Manche

=== Occitanie ===
- Fleury, Aude

== See also ==
- Champfleury (disambiguation)
- Fleurey (disambiguation)
- Fleurie, a commune in France
- Fleury Playbook, a medieval collection of Latin biblical dramas
- Cross fleury, in heraldry
