= François Debret =

French architect (1777–1850)

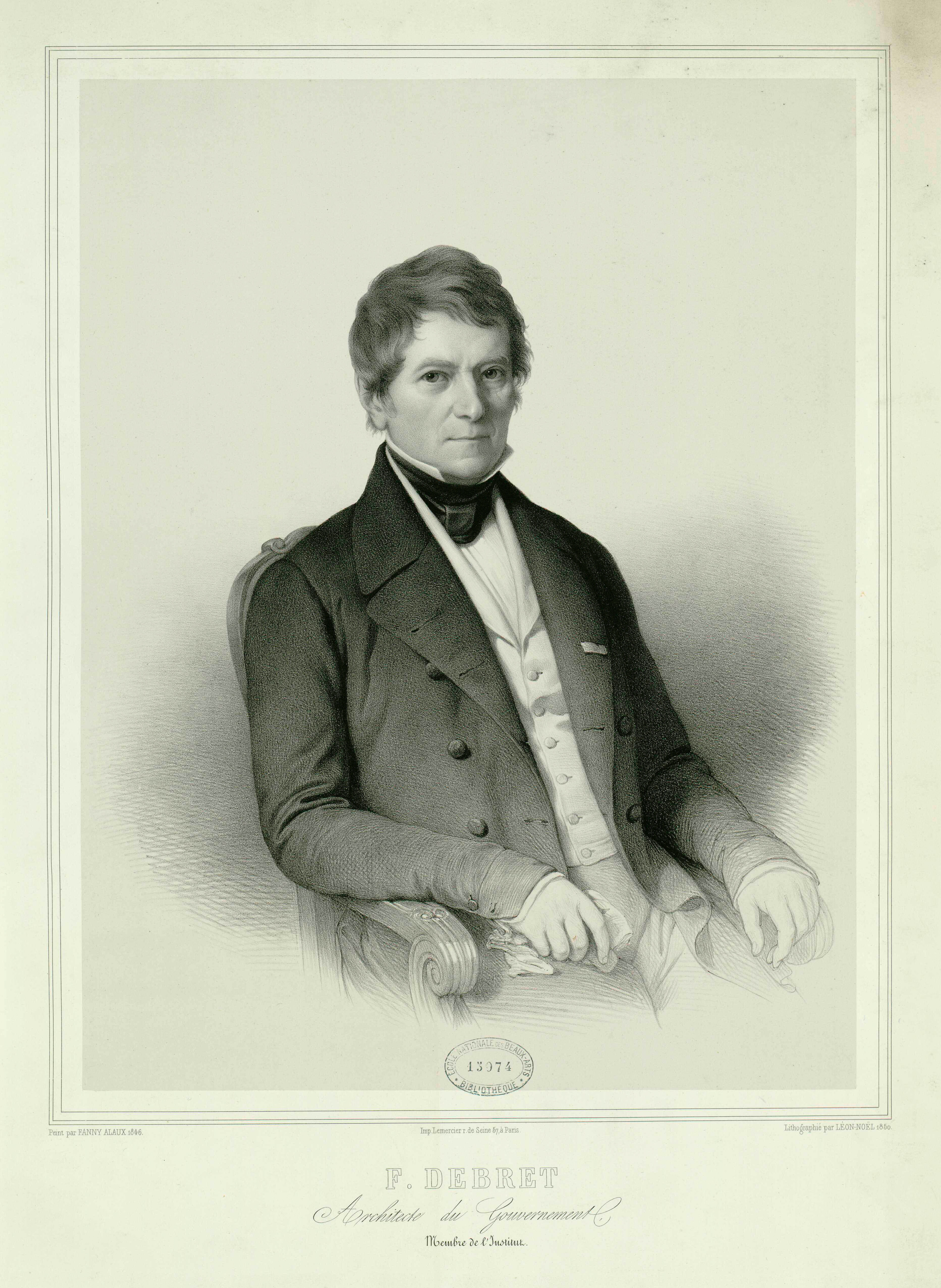
- Born: 27 June 1777; Paris
- Died: 19 February 1850 (aged 72); Saint-Cloud
- Resting place: Père Lachaise Cemetery; 48.861944°N 2.394167°E
- Occupation: Architect

François Debret (French pronunciation: [fʁɑ̃swa dəbʁɛ]; 27 June 1777 – 19 February 1850) was a 19th-century French architect and Freemason. He was one of a group of influential academic architects in the 1820s and 1830s that furthered the precepts of Percier and Fontaine, although little of his own work survives.

== Early life and training ==
Born in Paris, François Debret was the son of Jacques Debret, criminal court clerk of the Parliament of Paris. He was the younger brother of Jean-Baptiste Debret. In 1808, he married a sister of the architect Félix Duban. Their son, Francis, born in 1809, graduated from the French Académie des Beaux-Arts (Academy of Fine Arts).

Around 1793 Debret studied with Charles Percier.

== Career ==
In 1813, Debret succeeded Jacques Cellerier as the architect in charge of restoring the Basilica of Saint-Denis near Paris. His work there demonstrated a lack of understanding of gothic architecture. He supervised the trimming of stone from the church's flying buttresses, causing dangerous structural weakness; carried out the removal of authentic ornamentation; and added the anachronistic Gallery of Kings to the west facade. Already condemned by medievalists, he rebuilt the spire of the facade's north tower, after it was struck by lightning in 1837. The new spire was too heavy, jeopardizing the structural integrity of the facade. Relieved of his post in 1846 due to incompetence, he was succeeded by Eugène Viollet-le-Duc, who took down the spire in 1847. The disputes over Debret's designs for the church furthered the Gothic Revival in France.

In 1818–1819, he was assigned the task of transforming the former Augustinian convent in Paris into the École des Beaux-Arts, which had been revived in 1816 under the Bourbon Restoration. Debret supervised the construction of the serviceable Bâtiment des Loges (1822–1828) and built the foundation and south wing of the Palais des Études (started in 1820), but in 1832 was replaced by his former student and brother-in-law, Félix Duban, who redesigned it.

Debret was more successful with his theatre designs. After restoring Nicolas Lenoir's Théâtre de la Porte Saint-Martin in 1818, he remodeled the acoustically well-regarded auditorium of Victor Louis's Théâtre des Arts in 1819. His changes included raising the ceiling by replacing the original Ionic capitals with Corinthian. In 1820 he was commissioned to design the temporary opera house, the Salle Le Peletier, in which he essentially rebuilt the auditorium of the Théâtre des Arts (demolished by an ordinance of 9 August 1820). The design of the auditorium was so well received, it was prescribed as the official model for the auditorium of a new opera house in the competition of 1861. The Salle Le Peletier was destroyed by fire in 1873, and the Nouvel Opéra (New Opera) opened in 1875. Debret also designed the Salle de la Bourse, which opened in 1827.

Debret was elected a member of the Académie des Beaux-Arts in 1825 and became inspector general to the Conseil Général des Bâtiments Civils (General Council of Civil Buildings) in 1841. He was replaced by Rohault de Fleury as the architect of the Opéra in 1846 and shortly after the February Revolution of 1848 was dismissed as inspector general.

Among his students and apprentices was Antoine-Nicolas Bailly.

== Achievements ==
- Restoration of several theaters and buildings of the École des Beaux-Arts (1822–1832), set in the old musée des monuments français, founded in 1795 in the former Couvent des Petits Augustins, and closed by Louis XVIII in 1816. This work was continued by his brother-in-law Félix Duban.

== Gallery of works ==
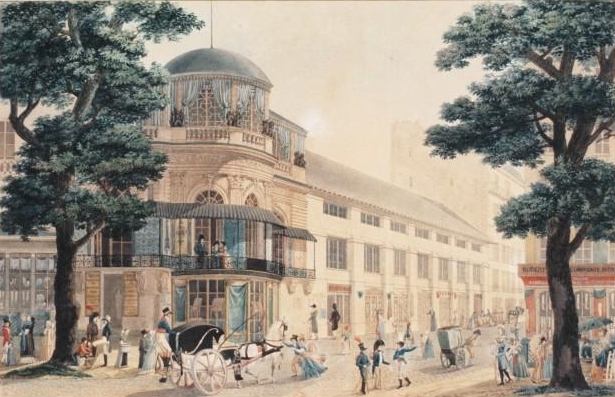
Pavillon de Hanovre on the Boulevard des Italiens.

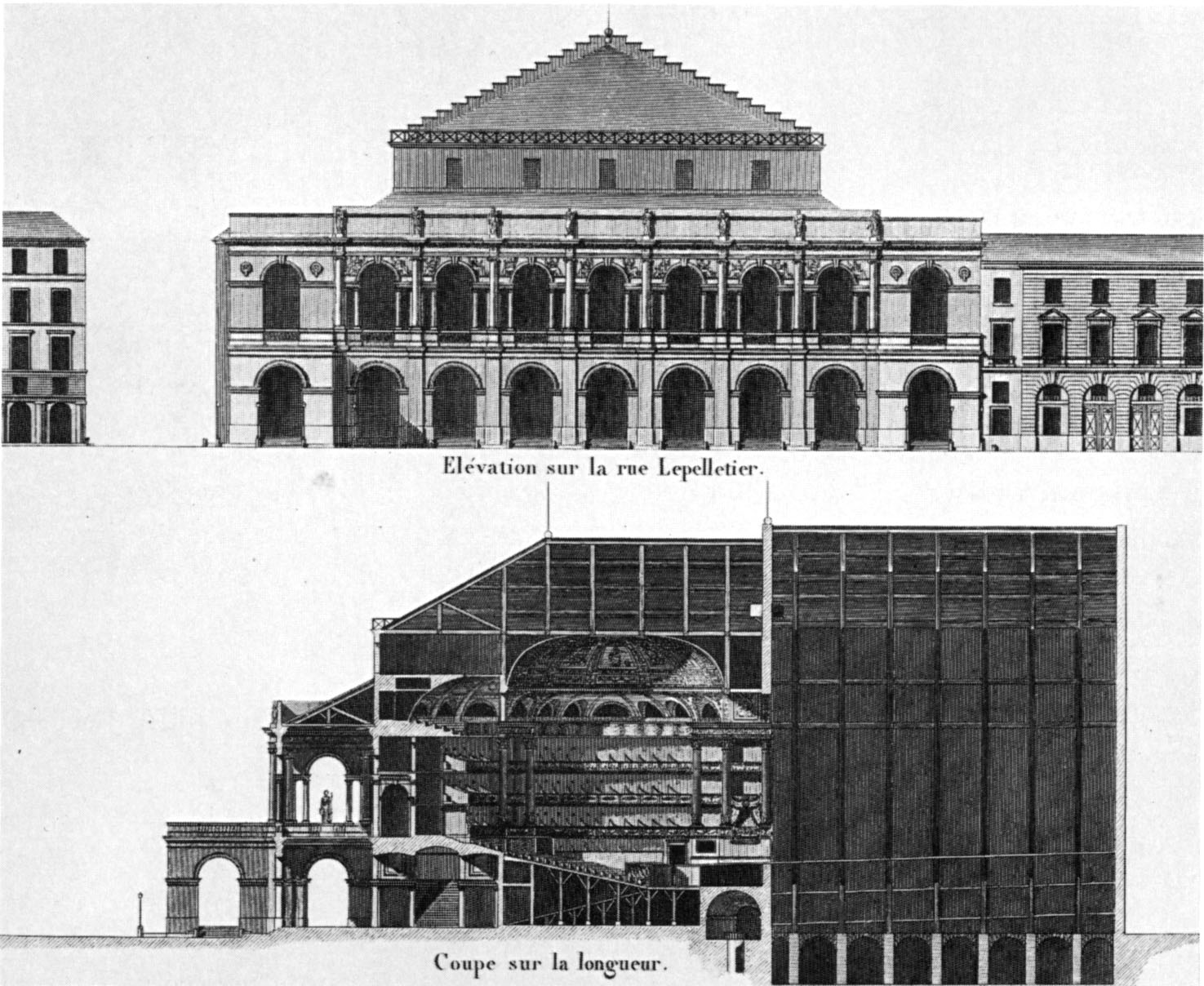
Salle Le Peletier, the Paris Opera from 1821 to 1873.

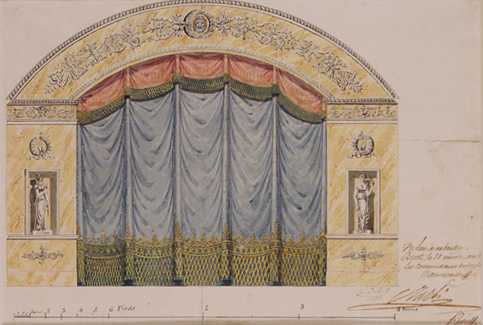
Transformable room for show, concert and dance, 1779.

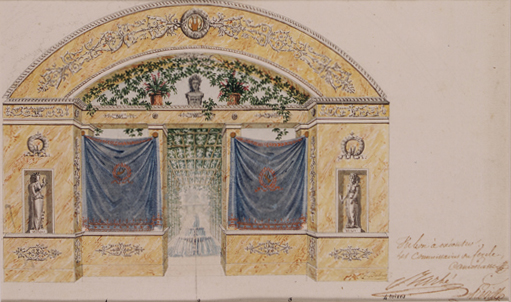
Transformable room for show, concert and dance, 1799.

== Bibliography ==
- Curl, James Stevens (2006). Oxford Dictionary of Architecture and Landscape Architecture, 2nd edition. Oxford and New York: Oxford University Press. ISBN 9780198606789.
- Lance, Adolphe (1872). Dictionnaire des Architectes français, 2 volumes. Paris: A. Morel. Vol. 1 and 2 at Google Books.
- Mead, Christopher (1996). "Debret, François", vol. 8, pp. 592–593, in The Dictionary of Art (34 vols.), edited by Jane Turner. New York: Grove. ISBN 9781884446009. Also at Oxford Art Online, subscription required.
- Wild, Nicole ([1989]). Dictionnaire des théâtres parisiens au XIXe siècle: les théâtres et la musique. Paris: Aux Amateurs de livres. ISBN 9780828825863. ISBN 9782905053800 (paperback). View formats and editions at WorldCat.
