= Antoine-Nicolas Bailly =

French architect (1810–1892)

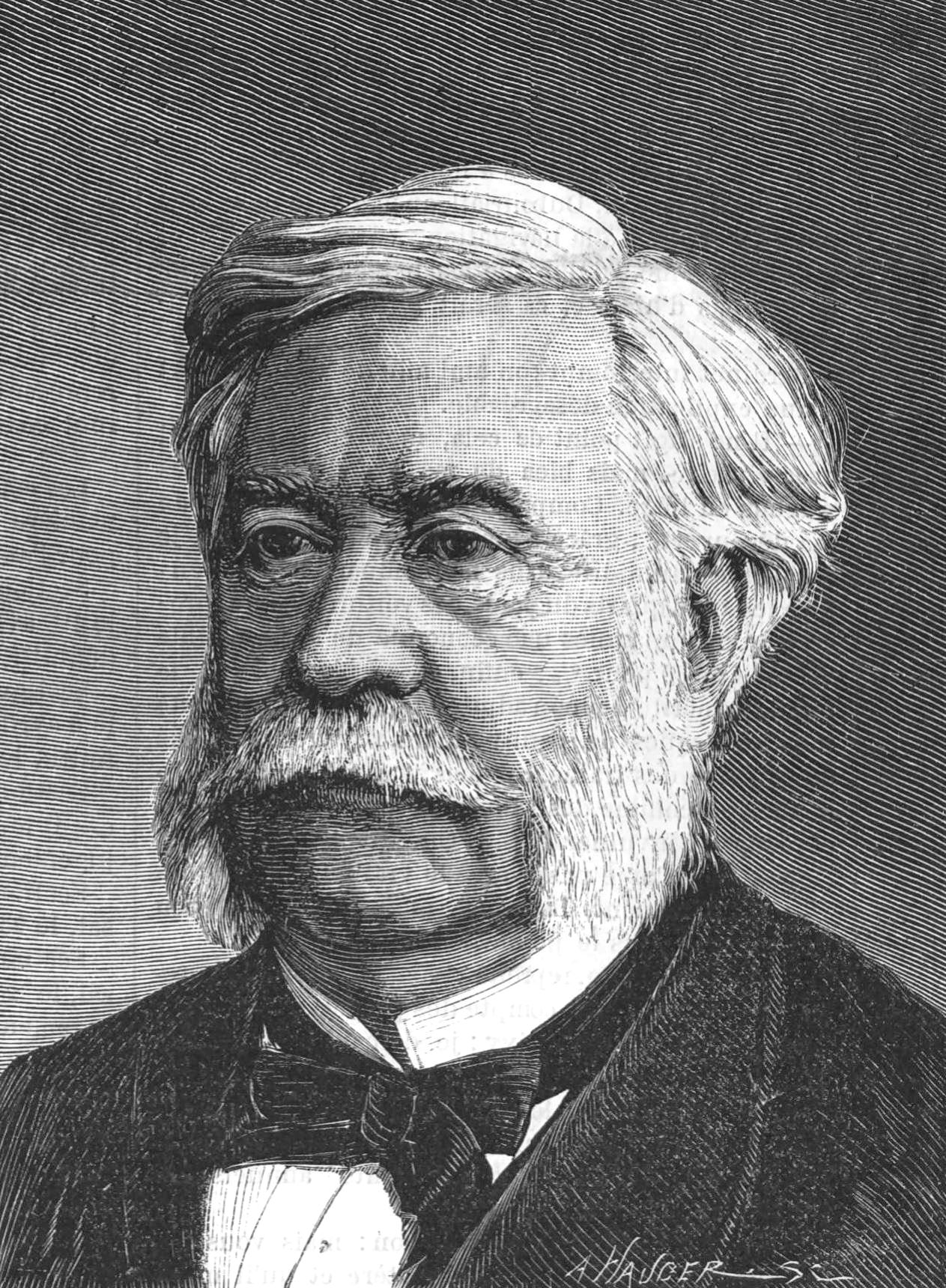
- Gravure d’Arthur Hauger d’après Truchelut.
- Born: 6 June 1810 former 3rd arrondissement of Paris
- Died: 1 January 1892
- Resting place: Père Lachaise Cemetery
- Occupation: Architect
- Awards: Chevalier of the Legion of Honour (1853); Officer of the Legion of Honor

Antoine-Nicolas Louis Bailly (6 June 1810 – 1 January 1892) was a French architect.

== Life ==
Born in Paris as the son of a postal official and the eldest of eleven children, Bailly entered the atelier of architect François Debret and through him the École nationale supérieure des Beaux-Arts in 1830, also studying under Félix Duban.

From 1834, upon his father's retirement, Bailly found himself responsible as the breadwinner for the entire family. In 1850, with the support of Eugène Viollet-le-Duc, Bailly became the architect of the dioceses of Bourges, Valencia and Digne. From 1875 to 1886, he served as diocesan architect of Limoges, and he was also the supervising architect of the Notre Dame de Paris from 1883 to 1886, after Viollet-le-Duc's restorations.

In 1854 Bailly was appointed inspector of works in Paris. As such he participated in the completion of the Old Town Hall and the construction of the Fontaine Molière under Louis Visconti. In 1860, Baron Georges-Eugène Haussmann commissioned Bailly with the administrative building for the 4th arrondissement of Paris, which served as a model for others.

His best-known work overall, although not the most admired, is the Tribunal de commerce de Paris (Commercial Court of Paris) on the Île de la Cité, completed in 1865, which Napoleon III had requested be designed in the style of the town hall of Brescia. Its business courts are organized around a glass atrium reaching the entire height of the building. The exterior features architectural sculpture by Albert-Ernest Carrier-Belleuse.

Bailly was made a Knight of the Legion of Honour in 1853, Officer in 1868, and promoted to Commander in 1881. He was elected to the Académie des Beaux-Arts in 1875, taking the chair of Henri Labrouste, and served as its president; he was also the first president of the Société des Artistes Français upon its founding in 1881.

Architect Ernest Sanson began his career as a draftsman in Bailly's firm, and took over the office in 1865.

== Work ==
- expansion of the Cathedral of Saint-Jerome Cathedral of Digne, completed 1862
- construction of the bell tower of the Valence Cathedral
- completion of the cathedral of Limoges
- Tribunal de commerce de Paris (Commercial Court of Paris) 1860-1865
- facade of the Lycée Saint-Louis, Paris
- mairie of the 4th arrondissement of Paris, 1866–1868
- Crédit Foncier de France, Paris (restoration and redevelopment)

== Gallery ==
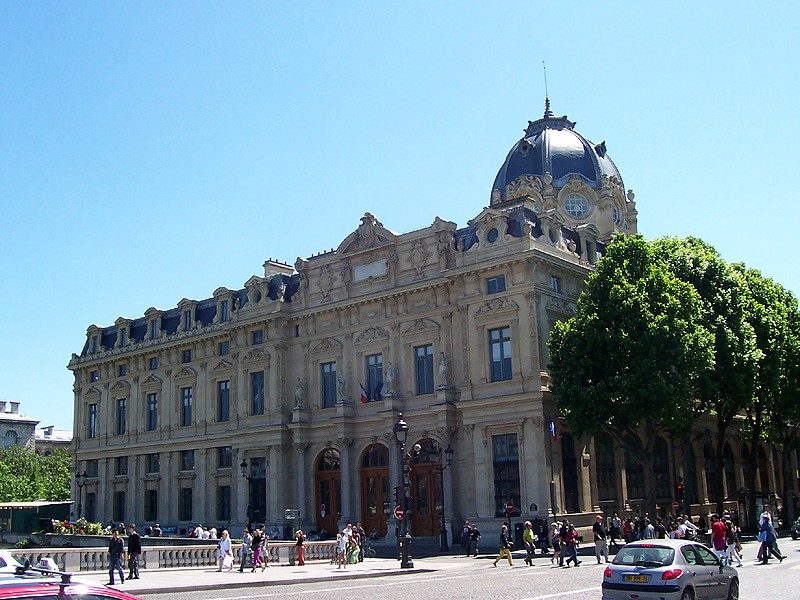
Tribunal de commerce de Paris (Commercial Court of Paris), Île de la Cité, Paris, 1865

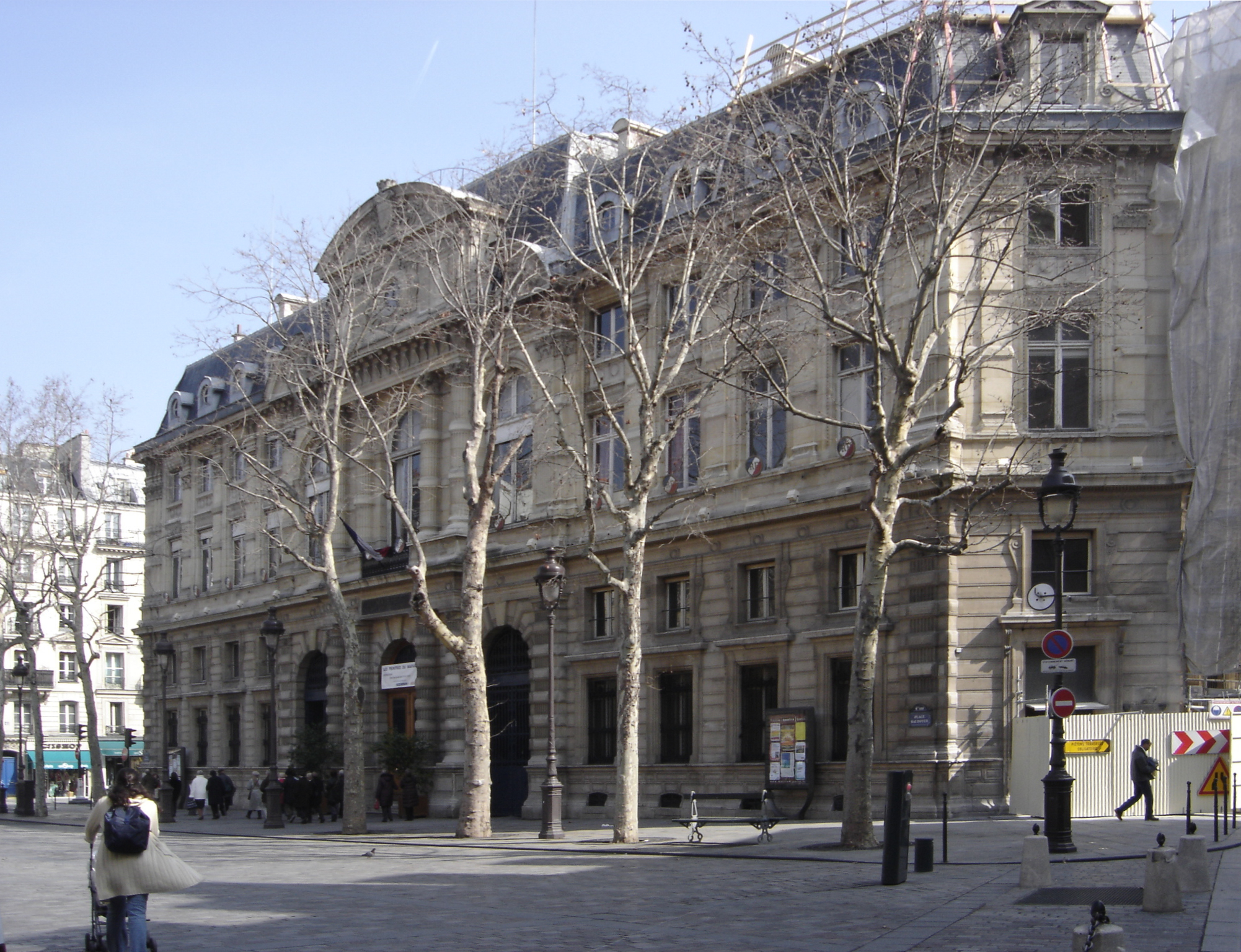
Hall of 4th arrondissement of Paris, 1866

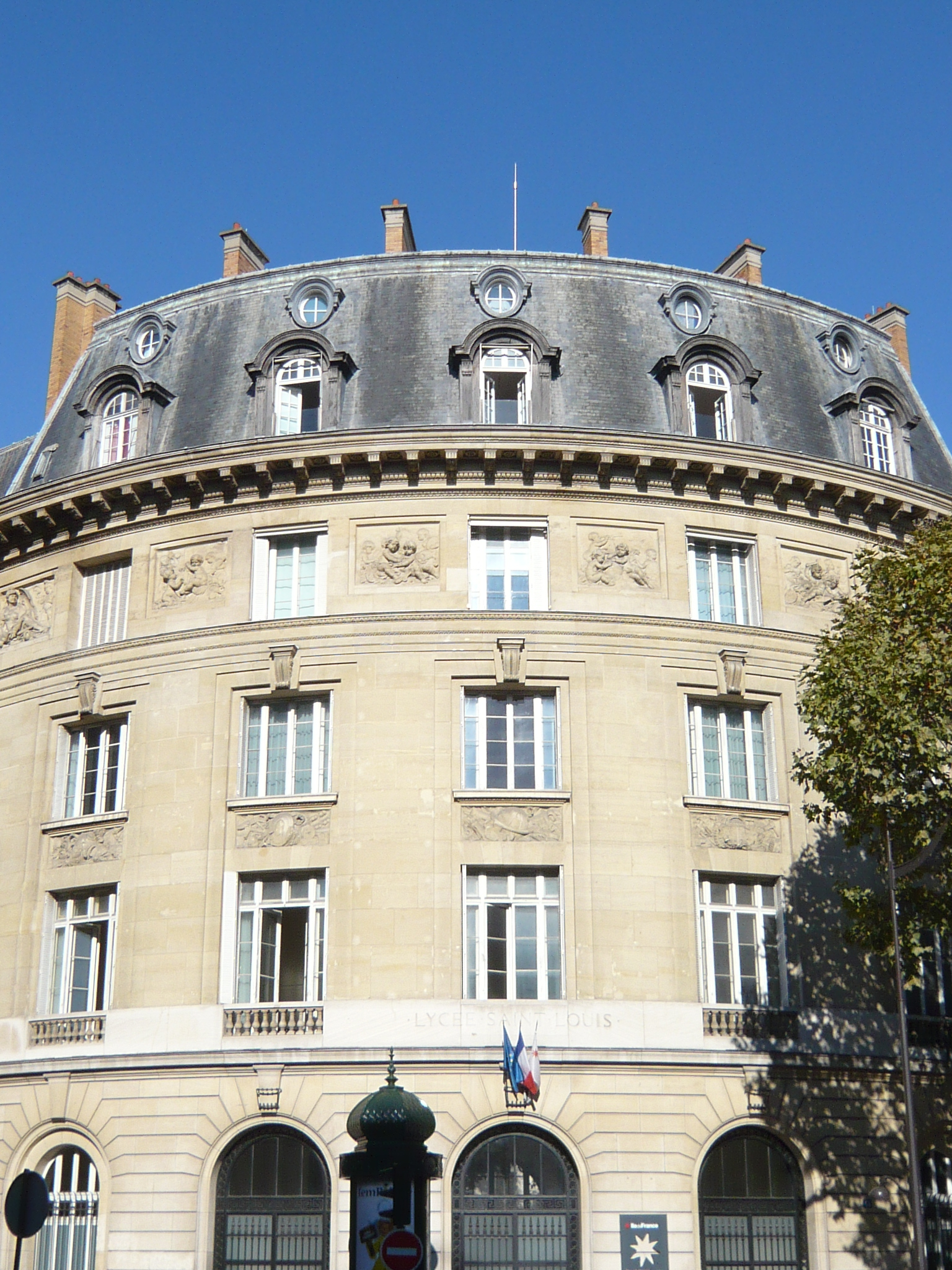
Lycée Saint-Louis, Paris
