= Fleury (name) =

The surname Fleury is of French and English (of Norman origin) and is classified as a toponymic surname (habitational name from Fleury). It derives from several places in France named Fleury, which themselves originate from the Gallo-Roman personal name Florus (from Latin florus meaning "blooming" or "flowering") combined with the locative suffix -acum. The surname is primarily of French and Norman origin, but it is also found in England and in Germany.

== Given name ==
- Fleury Di Nallo (1943–2026), French footballer
- Fleury Linossier (1902–?), French painter
- Fleury Marius (1896–1972), French aviator
- Fleury Mesplet (1734–1794), French-Canadian printer, founder of the Montreal Gazette newspaper
- Fleury François Richard (1777–1852), French painter

== Surname ==
- Amber Fleury (born 1979), contestant on Canadian Idol
- André Fleury (organist) (1903–1995), French composer, pianist, organist and pedagogue
- André-Hercule de Fleury (1653-1743), chief minister of Louis XV
- Antoine-Claude Fleury (1743–1822), French historical and portrait painter
- Aurore Fleury (born 1993), French middle-distance runner
- Brian Fleury, American football player and coach
- Charles Fleury (c. 1605–1652), French lutenist
- Claude Fleury (1640–1723), French ecclesiastical historian
- Eleanora Fleury (1860–1940), first female medical graduate of the Royal University of Ireland
- Émery Fleury (1901–1975), Canadian politician
- Fanny Fleury (1848–1920), French painter
- Gordon A. Fleury, American politician
- Haydn Fleury (born 1996), Canadian ice hockey player
- Jean Fleury (died 1527), French naval officer and privateer
- Jean-Gérard Fleury (1905–2002), French businessman, aviator, journalist and writer
- Lionel Fleury (1912–1997), Canadian ice hockey administrator
- Louis Fleury (1878–1926), French flautist
- Luiz Antônio Fleury Filho (1949–2022), Brazilian politician
- Marc Fleury (born 1968), French software developer
- Marc-André Fleury (born 1984), Canadian ice hockey player
- Mathieu Fleury (born 1985), Canadian politician
- Michel Fleury (1923–2002), French archaeologist, archivist and historian
- Michelle Fleury, British journalist
- Pat Fleury (born 1956), Irish hurler
- Paul A. Fleury (1939–2026), American physicist and academic administrator
- Sérgio Paranhos Fleury (1933–1979), Brazilian police official
- Sylvie Fleury (born 1961), Swiss pop artist
- Theoren Fleury (born 1968), Canadian ice hockey player
- Tracy Fleury (born 1986), Canadian curler
- Will Fleury (born 1989), Irish mixed martial artist

== Mononym ==
- Abraham-Joseph Bénard (1750–1822), known as Fleury, French actor and comedian
- Mademoiselle Fleury (1766–1818), Belgian actress in France

== See also ==
- The dictionary definition of fleur at Wiktionary
- Joseph-Nicolas Robert-Fleury (1797–1890), French painter
- De Fleury, a list of people with the surname
