= Flory (surname) =

Flory and Florie are surnames.

Those bearing them include:

- David Flory, an English NHS manager
- Jean Flory (1886–1949), French religious leader
- Tom Florie (1897–1966), American soccer player
- Ishmael Flory (1907–2004), American activist
- Paul Flory (1910–1985), American chemist
- Margaret Flory (born 1948), American politician
- Med Flory (1926–2014), American musician and actor
- Fran Flory (born c. 1962), American volleyball player and coach
- Jean-Claude Flory (born 1966), French politician
- Isabelle Flory, French violinist
- Bryce Florie (born 1970), American baseball player and coach
- Scott Flory (born 1976), Canadian football player
- Travis T. Flory (born 1992), American actor
