= Gallery of Mineralogy and Geology =

Museum in Paris, France

Coordinates: 48°50′30.5″N 2°21′28″E

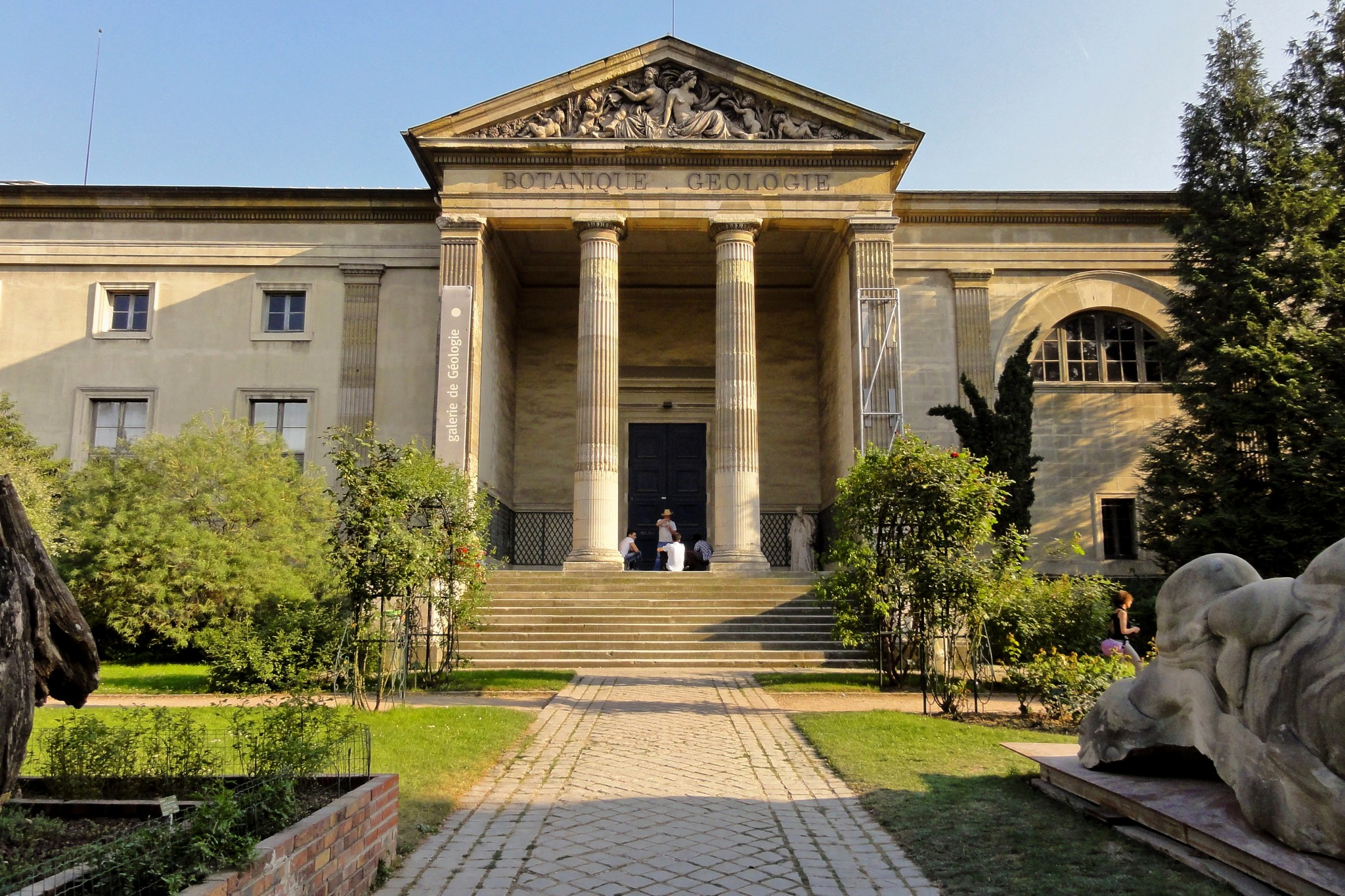
Left-side pediment and peristyle in the façade of the galerie de Minéralogie et de Géologie, constructed between 1833 and 1837 following plans of architect Charles Rohault de Fleury (1801-1875).

The Gallery of Mineralogy and Geology (in French, galerie de Minéralogie et de Géologie) is a part of the French National Museum of Natural History (Muséum national d'histoire naturelle, MNHN). It is situated in the Jardin des plantes ('Garden of the Plants') in Paris near the gare d'Austerlitz train station. The gallery displays a collection of crystals, gemstones and minerals parmi les plus anciennes et les plus prestigieuses du monde ('among the oldest and the most prestigious in the world').

== History ==
The collection is older than the building. It began in 1625, when minerals with medicinal properties were deposited in le droguier du roi ('the royal drug cabinet'). Thereafter, the droguier and its minerals were moved to the Jardin royal des plantes médicinales ('Royal Garden of the Medicinal Plants'), founded in 1635 under the rule of Louis XIII. The Jardin royal des plantes médicinales, as a location, corresponds in the present day to the still existing Jardin des plantes, but as an institution it nowadays corresponds to the French National Museum of Natural History. In 1635, when the Royal Garden was being founded, the mineral collections and the royal drug cabinet were transported to a château situated in the same property as the garden itself. In the same year, the so-mentioned château was also destined to receive the cabinet du roi (the 'Royal Cabinet of Curiosities'). Later, during the reign of Louis XIV, the mineralogical collection of the cabinet du roi was enriched on the orders of the king and put on public display as of 1745.

Years later the French Revolution broke out, spanning from 1789 to 1799. During the period, in June 1793, the revolutionaries who were ruling France transformed the Jardin royal des plantes médicinales into the still existing Muséum national d'histoire naturelle, but at this point in time the mineralogical and geological samples remained in the old cabinet du roi. After the French Revolution and after the reign of Napoleon, monarchy in France was back and ruled the country again. It was not until the reign of Louis Philippe I that a new building was planned in order to receive the mineralogy collections. Construction works started in 1833, and the new building was inaugurated in 1837, in the presence of the king. Since museum opened its doors to the public in 1841, its exhibition area has been around 2,000 m2. New building, designed by architect Charles Rohault de Fleury and still currently in use to show to the public the mineralogical collections, was the first in France to be designed as a museum. The building is partitioned, contiguously, into three different parts: a central nave originally destined to receive the mineralogy and geology collections, and two wings, one on the right-hand side of the central nave, the other on the left-hand side. The right-hand wing was originally intended to receive the Muséum's main library, as still stated in the right-side pediment of the building, where the word Bibliothèque ('Library') still can be read. The left-side wing of the building was originally destined to receive the Muséum's herbarium, but a new nearby building, the galerie de Botanique ('Gallery of Botany'), was inaugurated in 1935, with the purpose of preservation of all Muséum's vegetal samples, so the herbarium left its old allocated location and was sent to the new one, where it is still preserved.

In the late months of 1959, the old cabinet du roi was demolished in order to build on its footprint the current central library of the Muséum. As a consequence, during the 1960s, the rooms in the former library, situated in the Gallery's right wing, were destined to receive a chosen set of mineral samples. This area in the building, the former library, is still nowadays the current main exhibition space in the galerie de Minéralogie et de Géologie.

In 1972, as per the Muséum's herbarium had left the Gallery's left-wing since 1935, French paleontologist Jean-Pierre Lehman opened a galerie de Paléobotanique ('Gallery of Paleobotany') in this area of the building. The Muséum's paleobotanical collections were on exhibit at this new paleobotanical gallery until 1998, when it was definitely closed to the public. The Gallery of Paleobotany was permanently dismantled in 2005, although a few of its fossil plants are currently on exhibition at the galerie de Paléontologie et d'Anatomie comparée and at one of the greenhouses of the Muséum.

In 1982, the Muséum bought a collection of Brazilian giant crystals known as the Ilia Deleff collection. Born in 1921, Ilia Deleff, who had sold the collection to the French Muséum, is a Bulgarian physician and geologist who started collecting these unique giant crystals in the late 1950s. The Ilia Deleff collection of giant crystals is on exhibit at the galerie de Minéralogie et de Géologie since 1983.

Closed in 2004 for renovation, the galerie de Minéralogie et de Géologie reopened ten years later, in 2014, showing a completely new kind of path tour for its new permanent exhibition called Les Trésors de la Terre ('Treasures of the Earth'). It is much more pedagogical, focusing on crystallography and the classification of minerals. This permanent exhibition currently shows approximately 600 mineralogical specimens, out of a total collection of 770,000 specimens.
