= Château de La Motte (Lyon) =

Castle in Lyon, France

Coordinates: 45.7446°N 4.8525°E

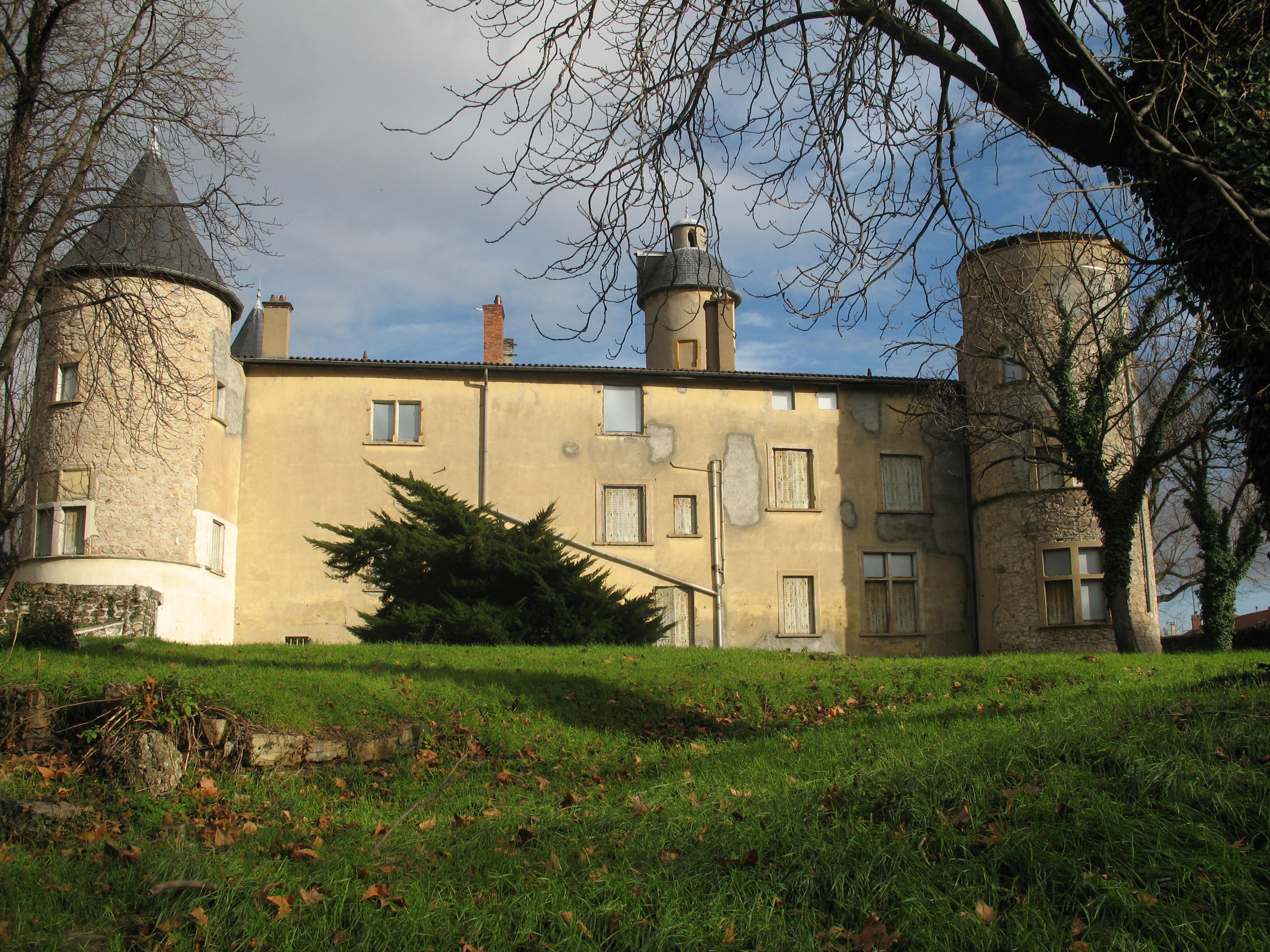
The castle of La Motte in Lyon in the Rhône

Château de La Motte is a French castle that is also known as The castle of La Motte or just La Mothe. It is located in the 7th arrondissement of Lyon, on the left bank of the Rhône. It stands near the junction of two ancient roads of eastern and southern Lyon, on the border between the Dauphiné and Lyonnais. It occupies a small hill (hence the name) created in Gallo-Roman times for flood protection and because of good visibility.

The main buildings are flanked by towers and a round tower around an irregular quadrangle courtyard. The entrance to the south, has preserved battlements. In the eighteenth century, the western wall was replaced by a terrace and a chapel was still visible in the nineteenth century.

The first records of the castle date back to 1476, when it was inhabited by Lord Jean de Villeneuve. The grandson of Jean de Villeneuve sold the castle in 1530 to Hugues Dupuy, who became known as seigneur de la Motte (Lord of La Motte) in 1554. The castle hosted several famous guests during the 1500s, including Louis XII and Marie de Médicis. Throughout the years, portions of the castle were given to a local convent, which inhabited the castle until just after the French Revolution, when it became "National Property."

In 1831, King Louis Philippe allowed General Hubert Rohault de Fleury to take the castle for the military and convert it into a fort, as part of the Fortification of Lyon.

After the First World War, André Maginot constructed residential blocks called "Barracks Sergeant Blandan" named after the war hero Sergeant Blandan, a resident of Lyon. In 1999, the army left the castle, being replaced by the National Police, but in 2007, the city of Greater Lyon acquired the area in order to make it a city park.

As of 1983, Château de La Motte has officially been registered as a "Monuments Historiques" (Historic Monument) by the French government.
