= Tribunal de commerce de Paris =

Historic court building in Paris

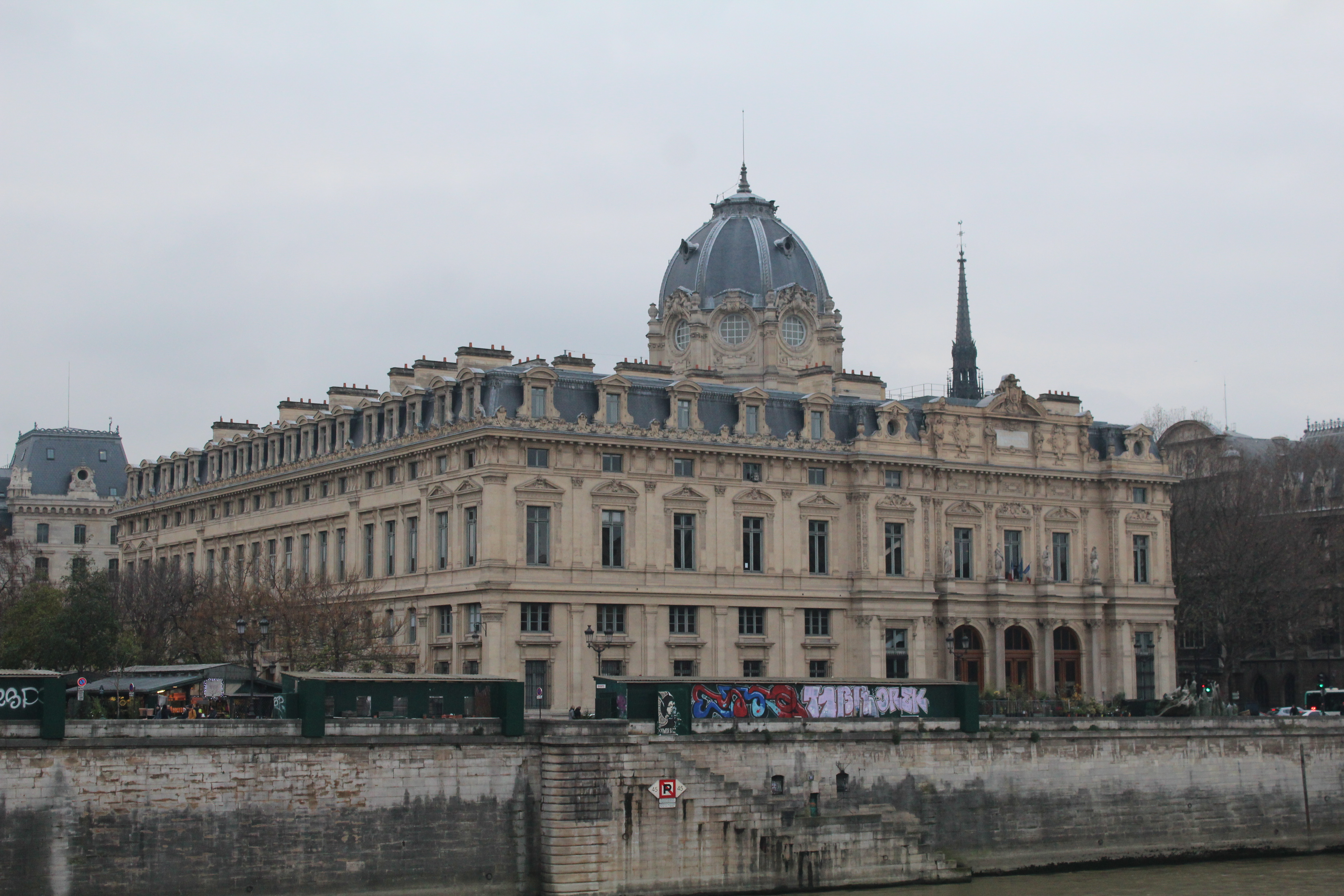
View from the northeast

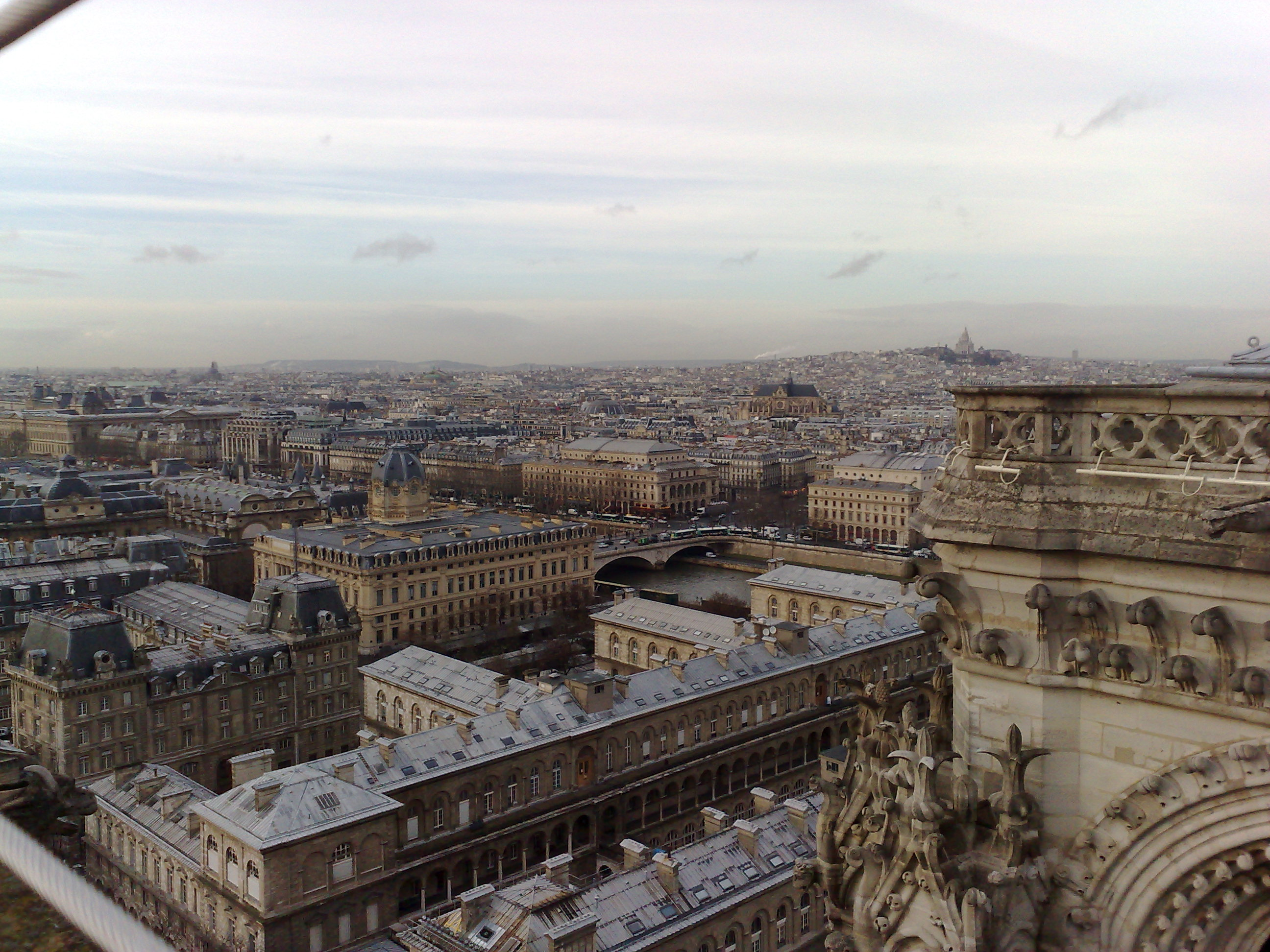
View from Notre-Dame de Paris: the Tribunal de Commerce surrounded by the Palais de la Cité, the Préfecture de Police, and the Hôtel-Dieu, with the Place du Châtelet across the Seine River

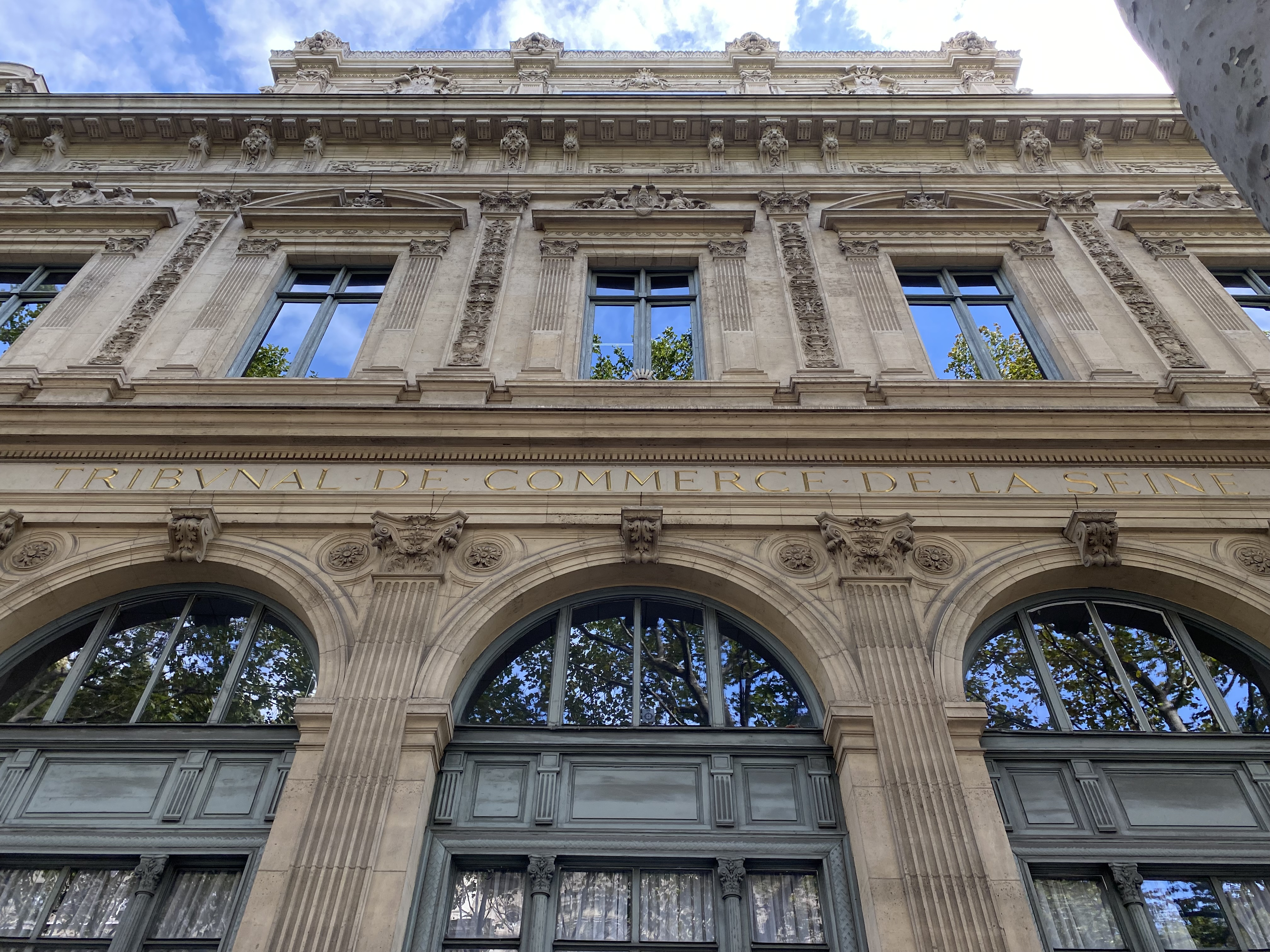
Façade on the Boulevard du Palais, with monumental inscription "Tribunal de Commerce de la Seine"

The Tribunal de commerce de Paris ("Paris commercial court[house]"), until 1968 Tribunal de commerce de la Seine, refers both to the tribunal de commerce of Paris, a commercial court, and to the building it occupies on the Île de la Cité in Paris. Because that building's main entrance is on the quai de la Corse, the phrase Quai de la Corse is used as a nickname for the court, particularly with reference to its role in corporate insolvencies.

== Court ==
The Tribunal de commerce de Paris traces its roots to the commercial court or tribunal des juges et des consuls de Paris, created in 1563 by Chancellor Michel de l'Hôpital. Along with many other such institutions, it was renamed in August 1790 during the French Revolution, thus "tribunal de commerce". After its first few years at Abbaye Saint-Magloire de Paris, the court was located on Rue du Cloître-Saint-Merri next to the Church of Saint Merri from 1570 to 1826. In 1826, it moved to the newly built Palais Brongniart, also home of the Paris Bourse. From 1790 to 1968 it was titled "Tribunal de commerce de la Seine"; it took its current name in 1968 upon the government reorganization that eliminated the Seine Department.

== Building ==
In 1857, the Conseil général de la Seine undertook the construction of a new building for the Tribunal de Commerce and the conseil des prud'hommes, which later moved to a different location. Part of the grounds that were reserved for the Tribunal had been occupied by the ancient Church of Saint-Barthélemy, which was demolished in 1791 and replaced by entertainment venues, first the Théâtre de la Cité-Variétés and then the Prado ballroom. That building and nearby houses were demolished in 1858 for the complete remodeling of the middle section of the Île de la Cité, a major project of Haussmann's renovation of Paris.

The courthouse building for the Tribunal de Commerce was built between 1859 and 1865 to designs by architect Antoine-Nicolas Bailly, inspired by the Renaissance Palazzo della Loggia in Brescia. It was inaugurated by Napoleon III on 26 December 1865, and the court held its first hearing the next day. In the 1930s, it underwent a remodeling that transformed the atrium's ceiling and lower parts of the northern façade, but the building has otherwise been largely preserved in its original state.

The main entrance on the Quai de la Corse is decorated with statues of Law by Élias Robert, Justice by Jacques-Hyacinthe Chevalier, Firmness by Louis-Adolphe Eude, and Prudence by Jules Salmson. Above these is a decorated pediment supported by four figures sculpted by Albert-Ernest Carrier-Belleuse. The ornate octagonal dome rises to a height of 45 meters and is the most distinctive feature of the building's exterior. Its position was chosen to close the perspective of the Boulevard de Sébastopol, and it is therefore not aligned with the center of the building's façade.

The interior is organized around two monumental spaces: to the east, a columned atrium (French: salle des pas-perdus), and to the west, a monumental staircase under the building's dome, entered through a vestibule decorated by a pair of monumental lions sculpted by Pierre Louis Rouillard. The staircase is decorated with colossal statues representing Maritime Commerce, by Henri Chapu; Land Commerce, by Paul Cabet; Mechanical Art, by Hippolyte Maindron; and Industrial Art, by Michel-Pascal. Above these are 16 caryatids by sculptor Didier Début, and the dome's ceiling with representations of the City of Paris, Arts, the City of Marseille, Grain harvest, the City of Lyon, Industry, the City of Bordeaux, and Grape-harvest, by Armand Félix Marie Jobbé-Duval. On the first floor, the main hearing room (French: grande salle d'audience) is decorated with busts of the court's founder Michel de l'Hôpital and of Jean-Baptiste Colbert, author of the ordonnance sur le commerce of 1673, and with historical paintings by Paul-Louis Delance and Joseph-Nicolas Robert-Fleury.

== Gallery ==
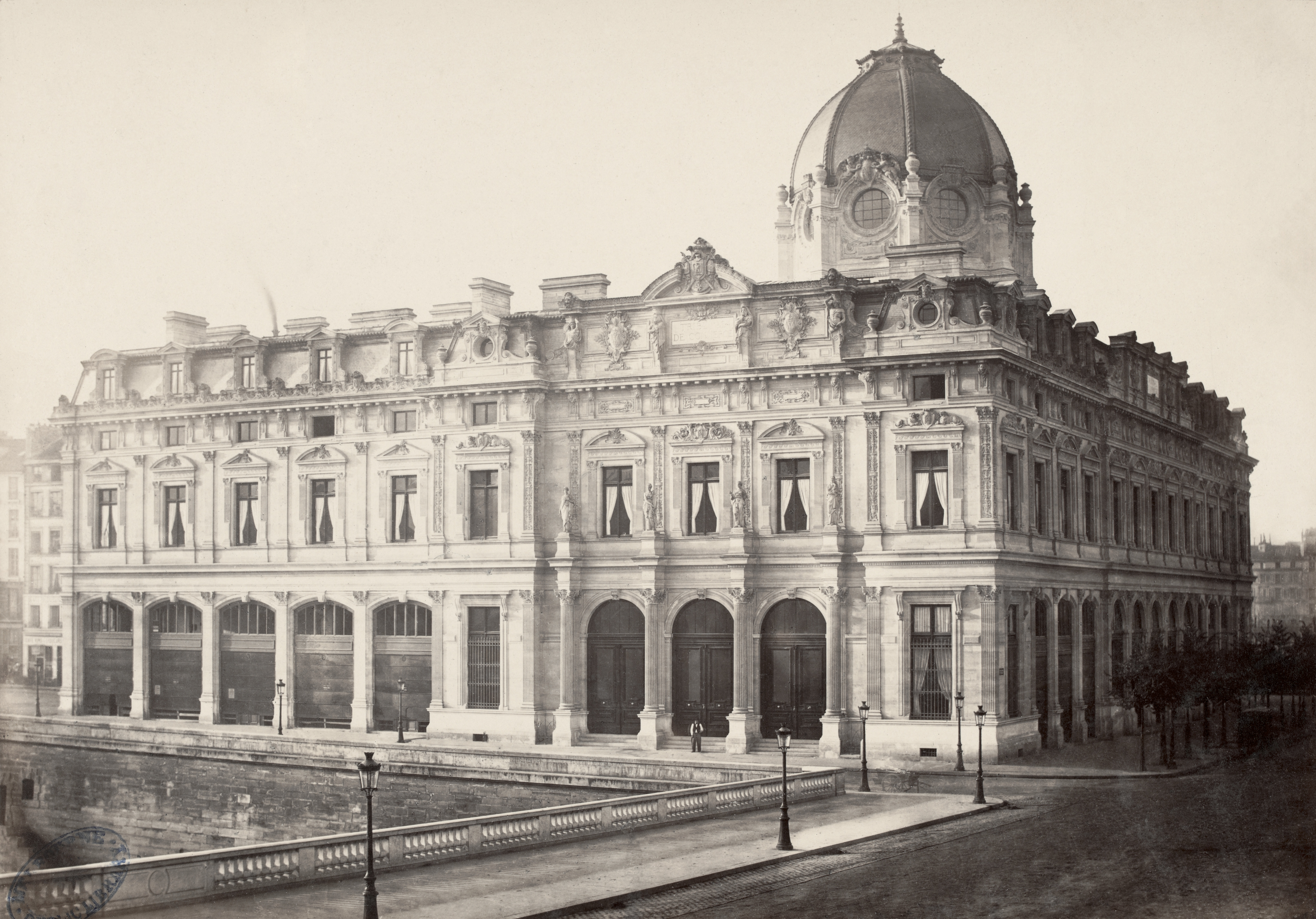
View in the mid-1860s, by Charles Marville

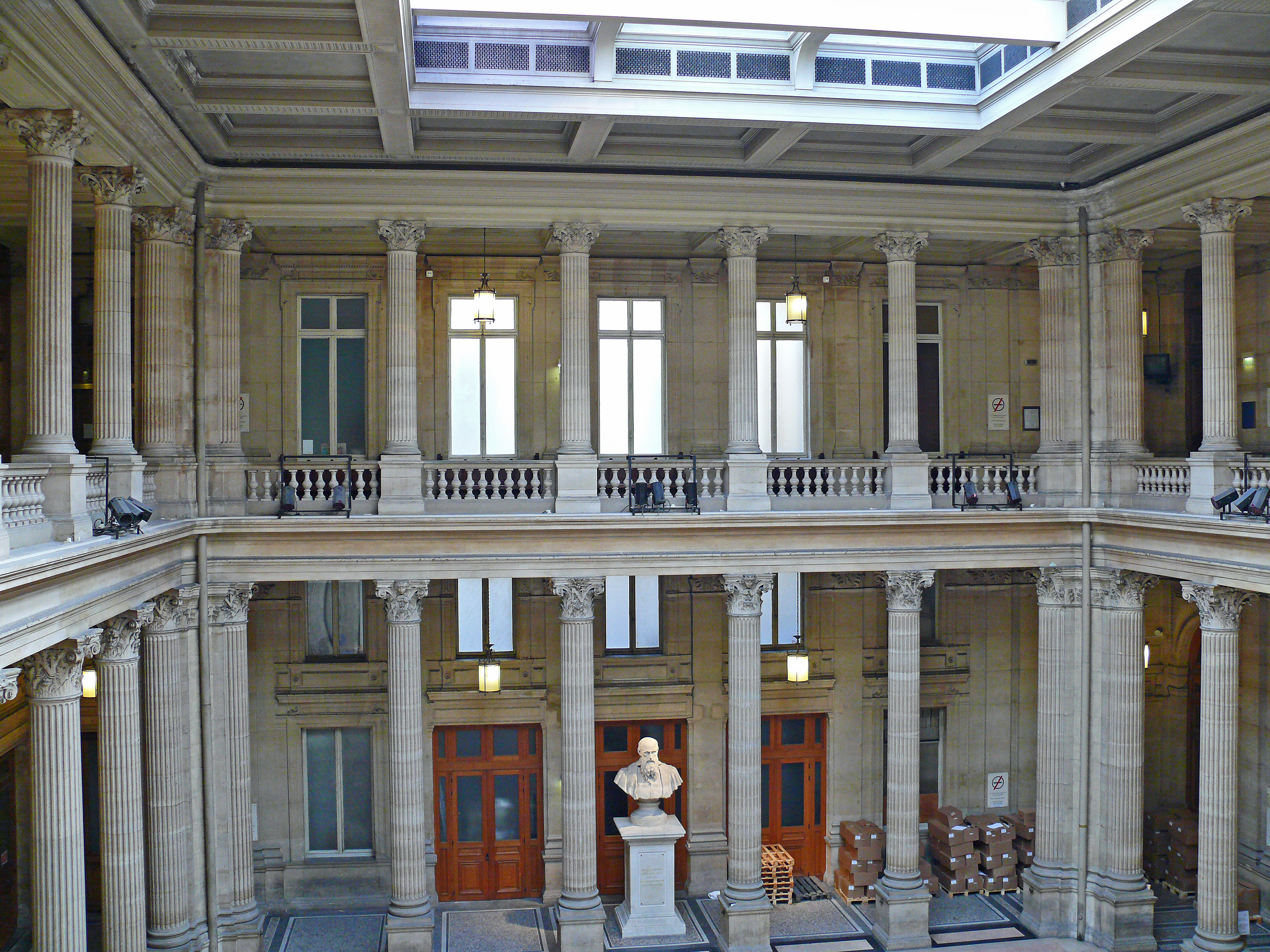
Atrium with bust of Michel de l'Hôpital

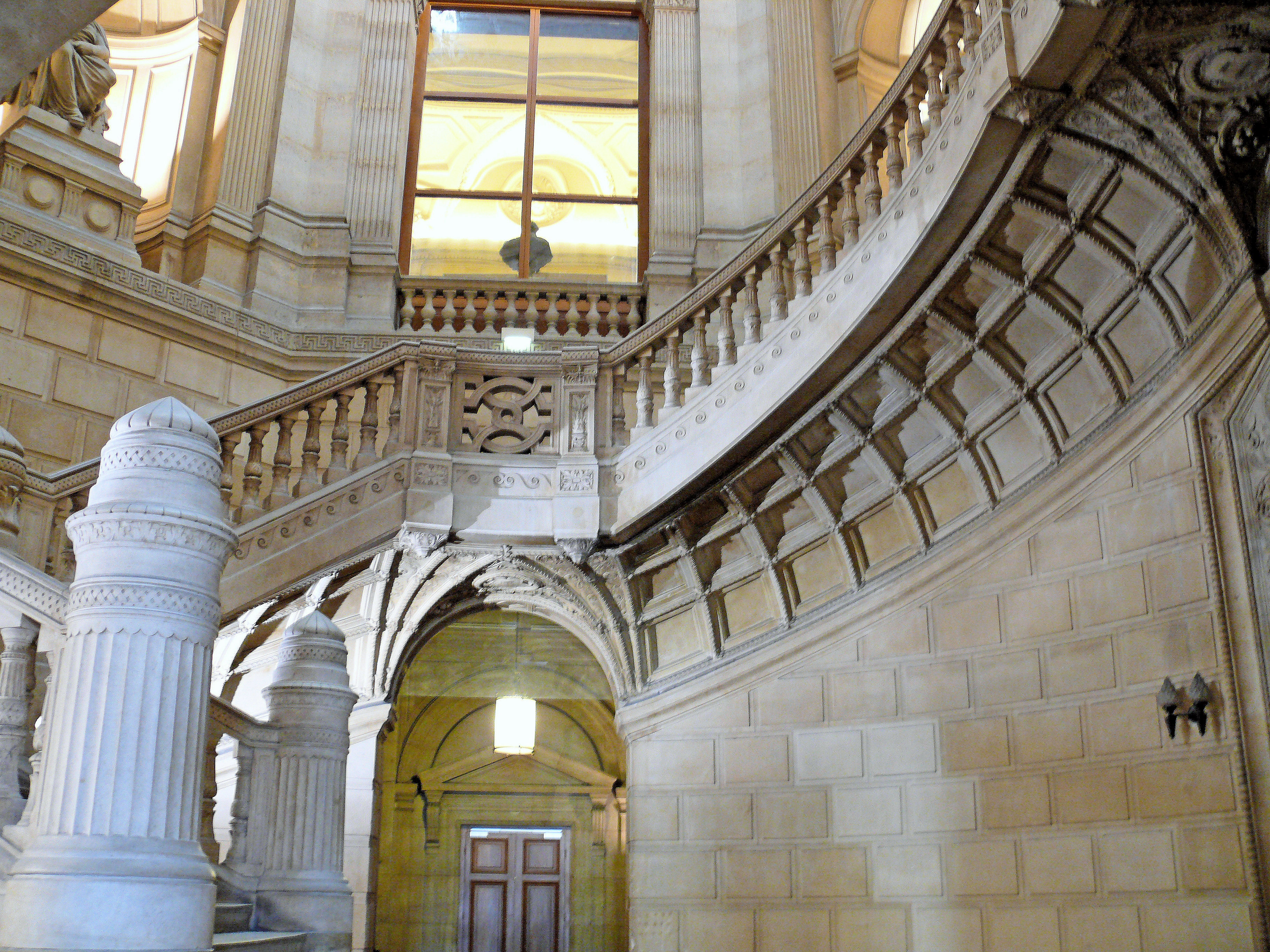
Monumental staircase

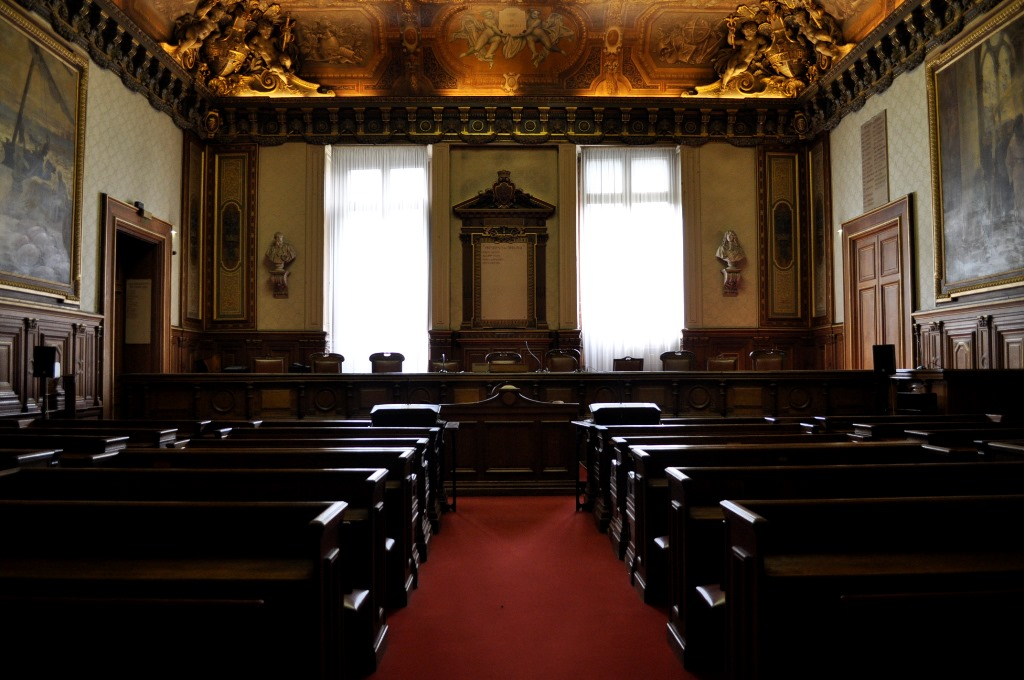
Grande salle d'audience

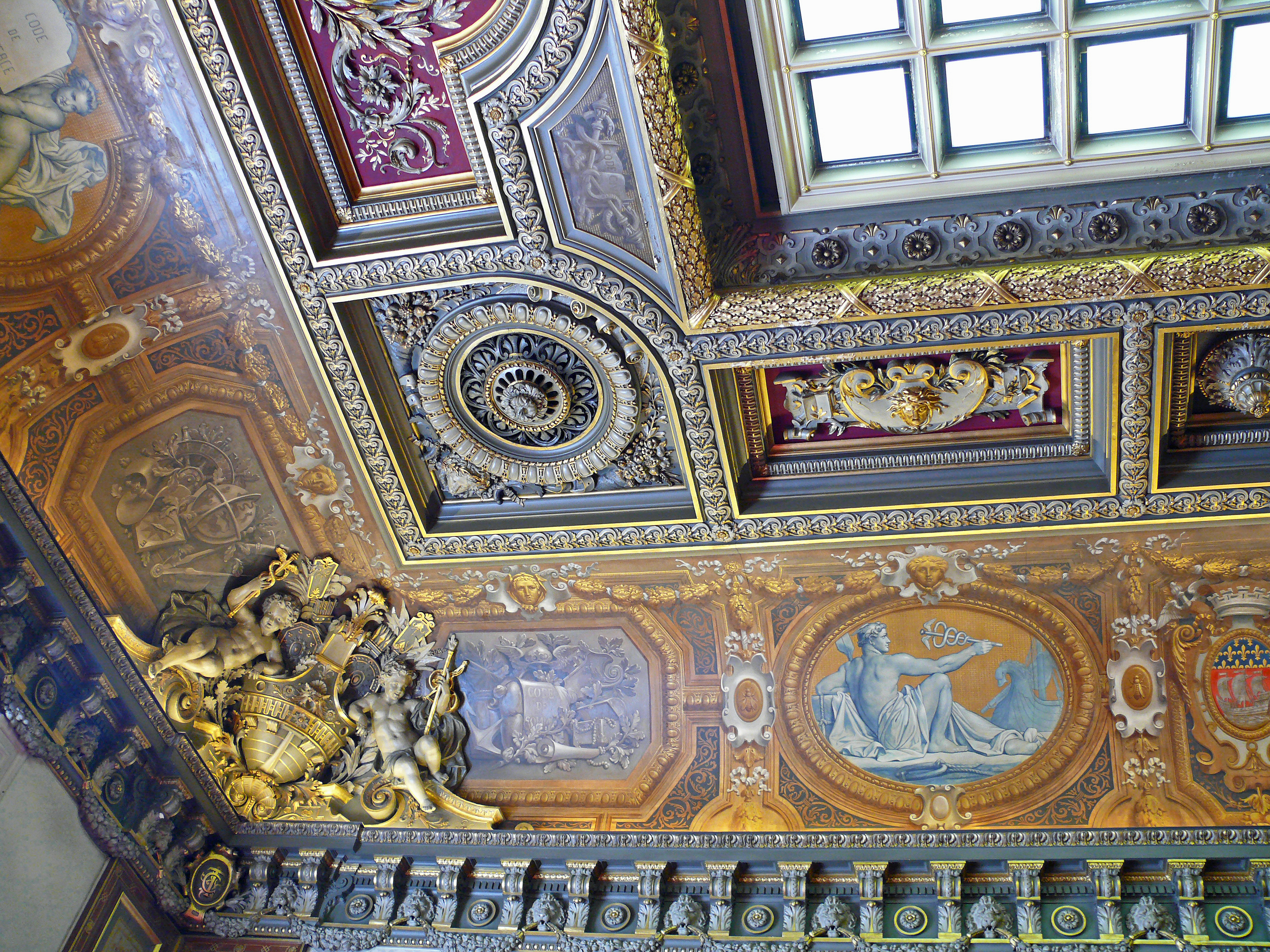
Grande salle d'audience, detail of ceiling

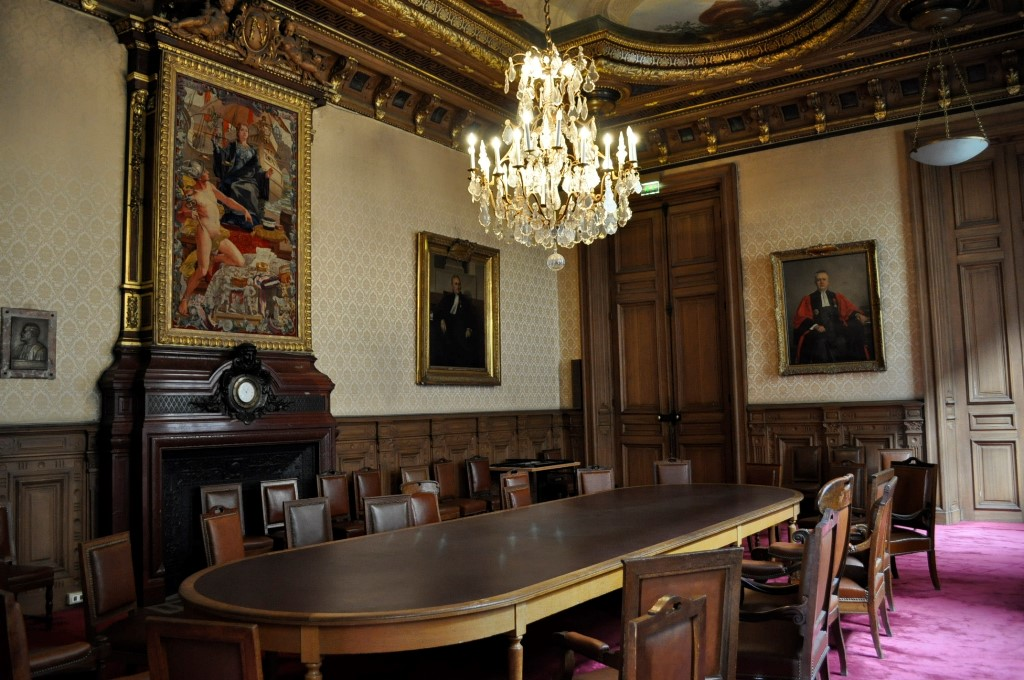
Chambre du Conseil

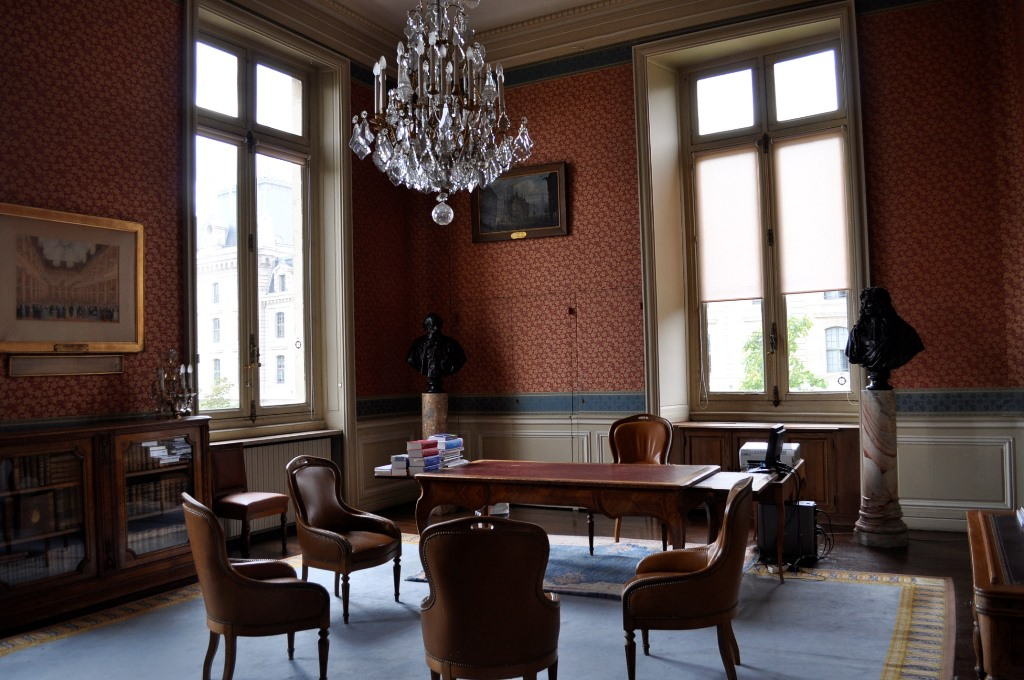
Bureau du Président

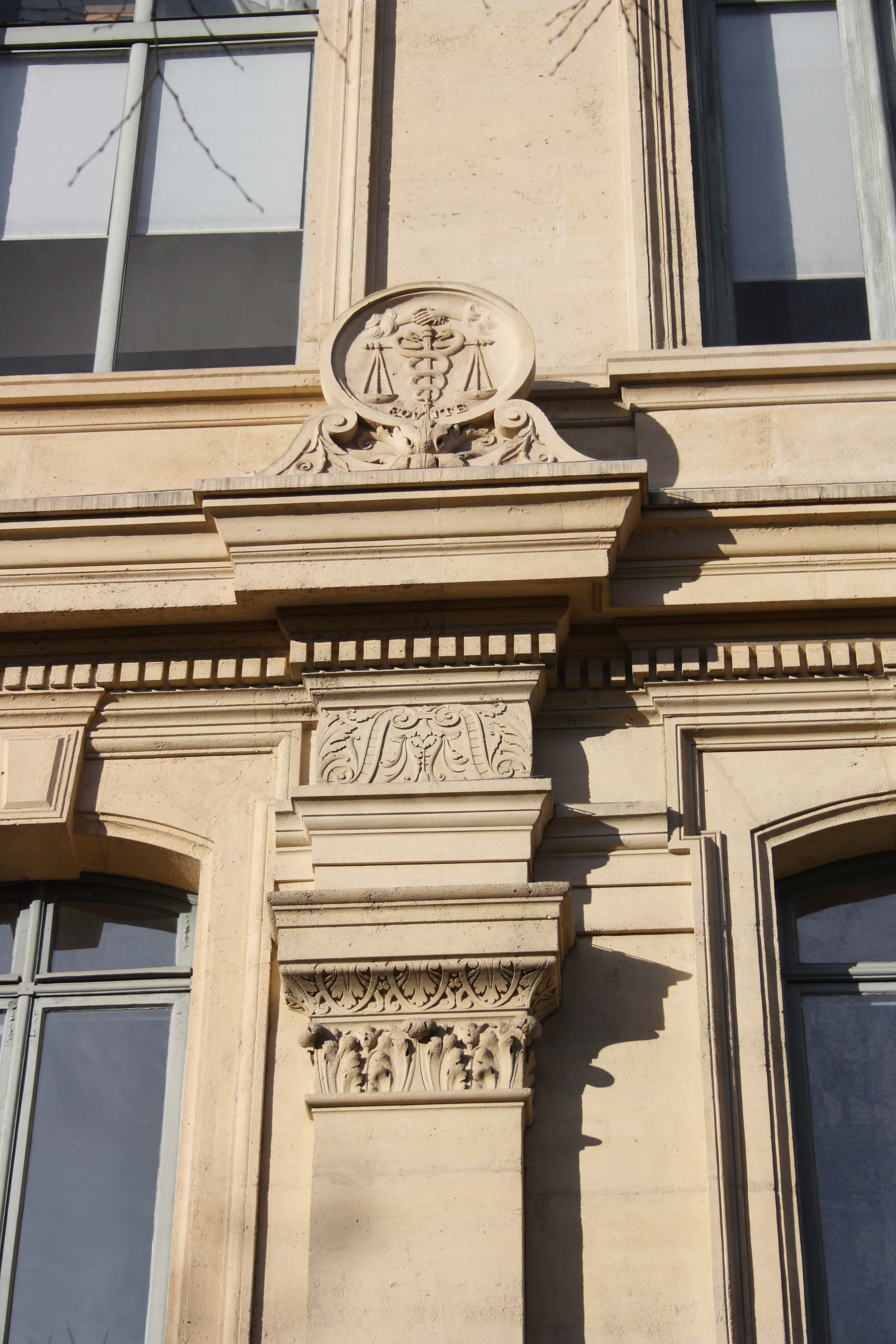
Detail of exterior decoration

== See also ==
- Palais de la Cité
- Paris Police Prefecture
