= Félix Duban =

French architect (1798-1870)

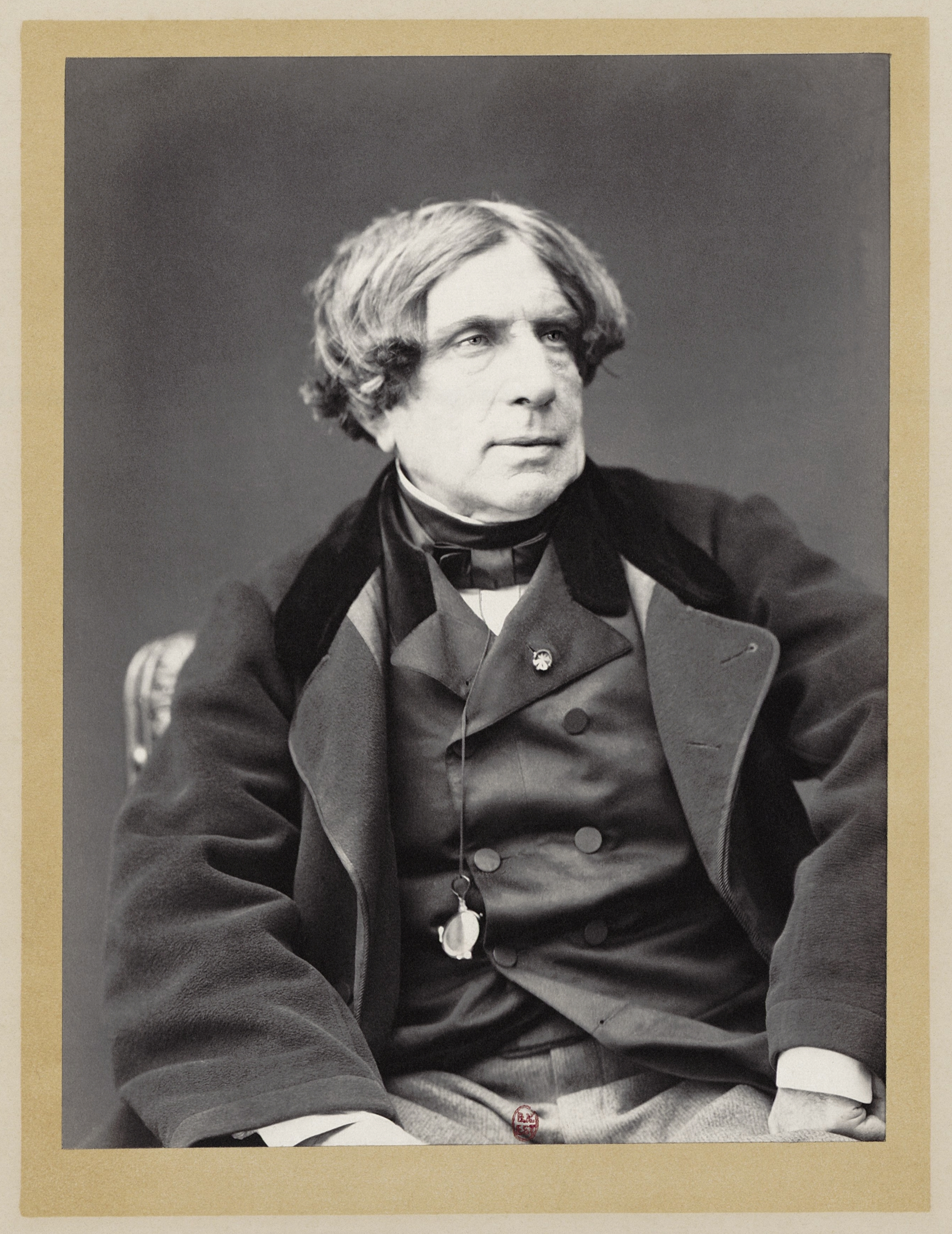
Félix Duban, 1860

Jacques Félix Duban (French pronunciation: [ʒak feliks dybɑ̃]; 14 October 1798, Paris – 8 October 1870, Bordeaux) was a French architect, the contemporary of Jacques Ignace Hittorff and Henri Labrouste.

== Life and career ==
Duban won the Prix de Rome in 1823, the most prestigious award of the École des Beaux-Arts. He was much influenced by his five-year stay in Italy, particularly his sense of color, influenced by the polychrome paintings of ancient Pompeii, newly uncovered Etruscan tombs, and the tradition of the great decorations painted in the Renaissance.

By far Duban's most visible work is the main building of the École, undertaken in 1830. The main building, the Palace of Studies, was designed with integral paintings and interior sculpture for artists' education. His redesign and alignment of the entire campus frames the main building from the entrance on Rue Bonaparte. With other expansions towards the Seine, this work was completed around 1861.

Duban was elected as member of the Academy of Fine Arts in 1854. Among his many students was Charles-Auguste Questel; he was the brother-in-law of fellow architect François Debret.

== Work ==
- Restoration of the castles of Château de Blois, Château de Gaillon, and Château de Dampierre
- Completion and restoration of the Apollo Gallery in the Louvre, beginning in 1848. It reflects and reinforces its structure and repairs coverage that protects the valuable decorated barrel vault, built in 1661 on the orders of the young Louis XIV.
- Restoration of the Sainte-Chapelle, with Jean-Baptiste Antoine Lassus and a young Eugène Viollet-le-Duc.
- Restoration of various historical monuments and private monuments
