= Fleury Linossier =

French architect and watercolor painter (1902–1997)

Fleury Linossier (17 August 1902 – 1997) was a French architect and watercolor painter associated with Bandol and the Toulon area. His architectural work in Bandol included the town's 1933 bandstand, municipal buildings and, with his son Claude Linossier, the Hôtel Île Rousse. He was also active in the French Resistance during the Second World War.

== Biography ==
Military archival records give Linossier's date of birth as 17 August 1902 and his birthplace as Bois-Colombes, then in the Seine department. He trained as an architect and later established an architectural practice in southern France. His son, architect Claude Linossier, subsequently worked with him on architectural projects in the Toulon area.

Linossier became particularly associated with the development of Bandol. In 1933, a bandstand designed by him was constructed by the Girardi brothers and inaugurated on 4 June of that year. The French cultural heritage inventory also identifies Linossier as an architect associated with Bandol's twentieth-century development.

Other works attributed to Linossier in Bandol include the Hôtel de Ville, the Octave-Maurel school complex, the Naron primary school, the Deferrari stadium and alterations to the Grand Hôtel. The Hôtel Île Rousse, completed in 1960, was designed by Fleury and Claude Linossier. The French Ministry of Culture also records Fleury Linossier's participation in residential architecture in the wider Toulon area, including projects at Ollioules and Toulon.

== Second World War ==
During the Second World War, Linossier was involved in the French Resistance. The Service historique de la Défense holds an officially recognized Resistance dossier for him under reference GR 16 P 373421. He also appears in the archival inventory of agents and networks of the French intelligence services under dossier 2979.

Nice-Matin reported that Linossier used the Resistance pseudonym "Lescalier" and took part in activities connected with the liberation of the port of Toulon.

== Painting ==
In addition to architecture, Linossier worked as a landscape painter, particularly in watercolor and mixed media. Nice-Matin described him as a recognized watercolorist and noted that contemporary art criticism compared his landscape work with that of J. M. W. Turner and Jean-Baptiste-Camille Corot.

Surviving works include landscapes and coastal subjects. Auction catalogues have recorded works such as Levé du jour (1971), executed in oil, gouache and ink on cardboard, as well as watercolor landscapes and marine subjects.

Linossier's architectural and artistic careers overlapped for much of his life. Municipal publications in Bandol continue to identify him as both an architect and watercolorist, particularly in connection with the preservation of his 1933 bandstand.

== Architectural works ==
Selected documented works include:

- Bandol bandstand, Bandol (1933)
- Hôtel de Ville, Bandol
- Octave-Maurel school complex, Bandol
- Naron primary school, Bandol
- Deferrari stadium, Bandol
- Hôtel Île Rousse, Bandol, with Claude Linossier (1960)
- Villa Mamichka, Bandol
