= Fleurey (disambiguation) =

Fleurey is the name or part of the name of several communes in France:

- Fleurey, Doubs
- Fleurey-lès-Faverney, Haute-Saône
- Fleurey-lès-Lavoncourt, Haute-Saône
- Fleurey-lès-Saint-Loup, Haute-Saône
- Fleurey-sur-Ouche, Côte-d'Or

== See also ==
- Fleury (disambiguation)
