= Charles Rohault de Fleury =

French architect

- Born: 22 September 1801; Paris, France
- Died: 11 August 1875 (aged 73)
- Occupation: Architect

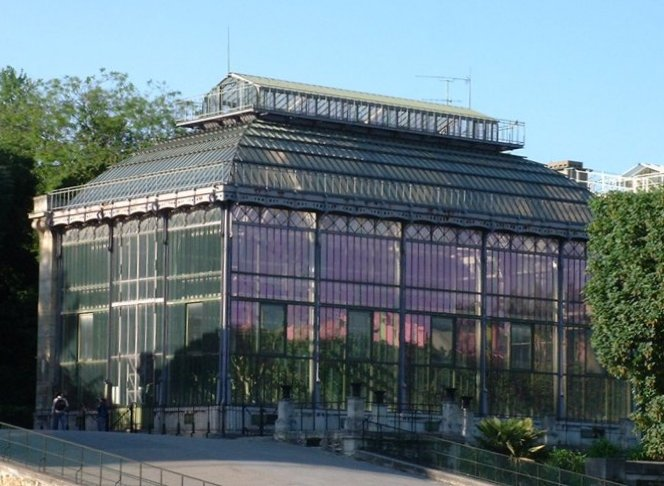
The Mexican Hothouse, built (1834–36) by Rohault de Fleury, an early example of French glass and metal architecture

Charles Rohault de Fleury (or Rohaut de Fleury; 22 September 1801 – 11 August 1875) was a French architect who designed many buildings in Paris, France, in the 19th century. In his later life he wrote a number of books on archaeological and religious subjects.

== Early years ==
Charles Rohault de Fleury was born in Paris on 22 September 1801, son of the architect Charles Hubert Rohault de Fleury (1777–1846). His uncle was Baron Hubert Rohault de Fleury, a distinguished military engineer. He studied at the École Polytechnique in Paris, and graduated in 1822. At first he studied sculpture, but then decided to take up architecture. He became a pupil of his father, then studied under Louis-Hippolyte Lebas and at the École des Beaux-Arts. After completing his studies, in 1823 he was named inspector of barracks buildings for the Paris gendarmerie. In 1827 he won a prize for his design for the Lille courthouse.

== Career ==
=== Architecture ===
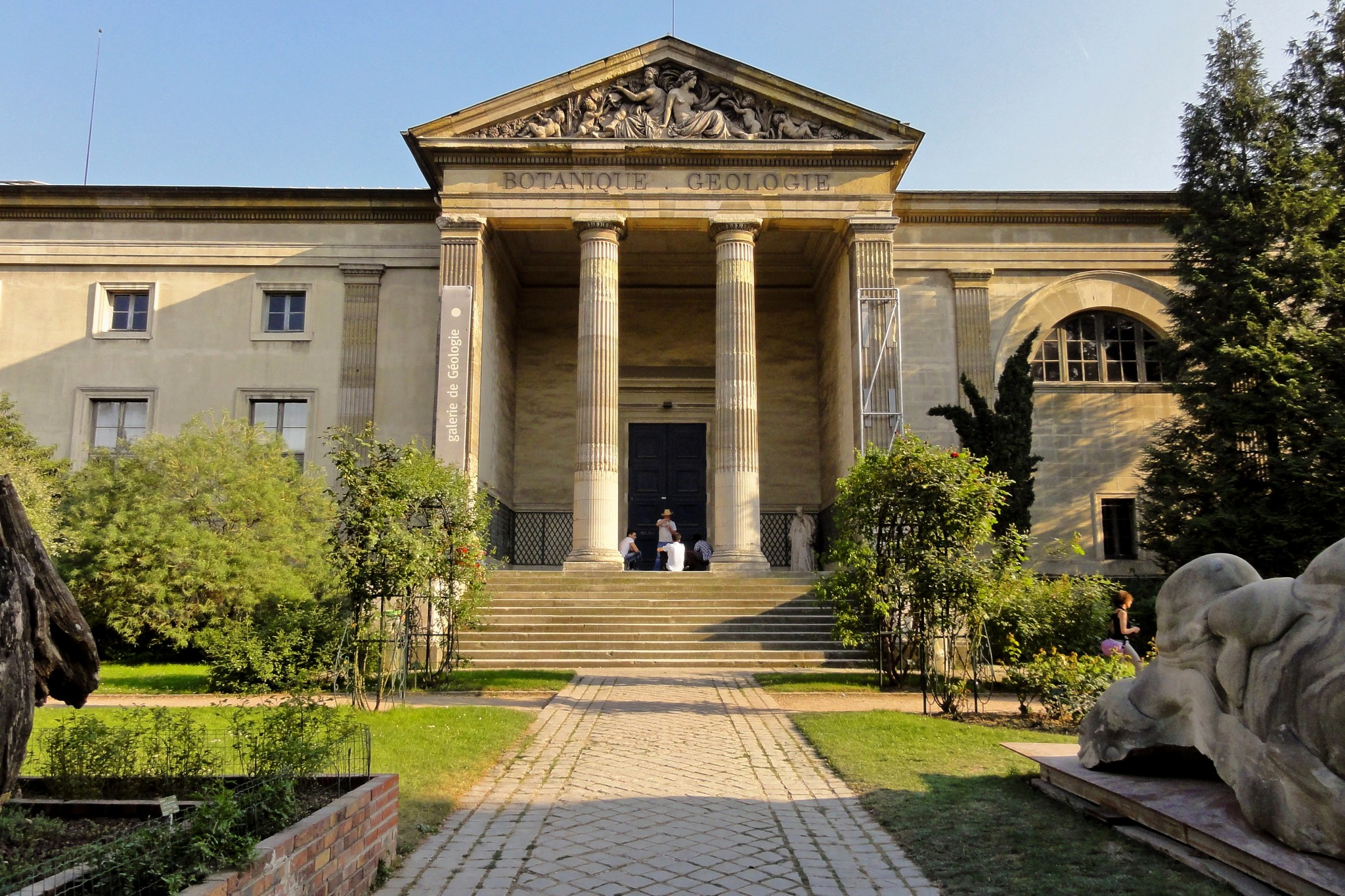
Galerie de Minéralogie et de Géologie in the Jardin des Plantes

In 1829, Rohault de Fleury and M. de Belleyme were commissioned to design a huge maison de refuge (shelter for the poor). In 1832 Rohault de Fleury was named architect of the Museum of Natural History in Paris, replacing Jacques Molinos. Between 1832 and 1838 he designed the Galerie de Minéralogie et de Géologie, the greenhouses and the monkey house. His use of glass in what are now the Mexican and Australian hot-houses was highly innovative for the period. In 1833 he was named architect of the several hospitals and hospices in Paris. He exhibited at the Salon in 1837. In 1840 he made plans for an Italian opera house.

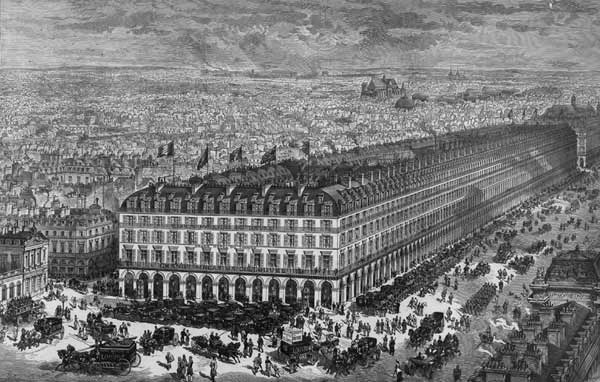
Grand Hôtel du Louvre in 1877

Rohault de Fleury was part of the team led by Alfred Armand (1805–88) that designed the Grand Hôtel du Louvre, which opened in 1855 in time for the Exposition Universelle. The others were Jacques Ignace Hittorff (1793–1867) and Auguste Pellechet (1829–1903). He built the Chambre des Notaires in 1857. He worked with Hittorff in 1857 and 1858 on plans for the buildings around the place de l'Étoile. He designed several other buildings including the Hippodrome, the old Opéra, the Stolikoff hotel on the rue Saint-Armand and the Casimir Périer hotel on the avenue Montaigne.

Charles Rohault de Fleury was named Chevalier of the Legion of Honour in 1843, and became an officer on 1 January 1861. His son Hubert Rohault de Fleury became a painter, and was instrumental in the erection of the Basilica of Sacré-Cœur, Paris. His other son Georges Rohault de Fleury (1835–1904) was trained as architect but became an archaeologist and art historian.

=== Religious studies and archaeology ===
After 1865 Charles Rohault de Fleury devoted himself to archaeological and religious studies with his son Georges, who arranged for publication of his works. One of these books was titled Mémoire sur les Instruments de la Passion, and served to catalogue supposed relics of the True Cross, and analyze the proposition that if put together all of the relics would account for far more wood than would make one cross. He came to the conclusion that the relics found came up to far less wood than would make up a cross used in a Roman crucifixion.

== Death and posthumous works ==
Charles Rohault de Fleury died on 11 August 1875. His work on the jardin des plantes at the museum was published in folio in 1876 under the title Muséum d'histoire naturelle. Some of his other works were published posthumously by his son George.

== Publications ==
Published works include:

- de Fleury, Charles Rohault (1862). Manuel des lois du bâtiment. Paris: Société centrale des architectes.
- de Fleury, Charles Rohault (1866). Monuments de Pise au Moyen Âge. Paris.
- de Fleury, Charles Rohault (1870). Les instruments de la passion. Paris: Paris : L. Lesort.
- de Fleury, Charles Rohault (1874). L'évangile, études iconographiques et archéologiques. 2 volumes. Paris.
- de Fleury, Charles Rohault (1874). La Toscane au Moyen Âge. Lettres sur l'architecture en 1400. Paris: Paris : Vve A. Morel et cie.
- de Fleury, Charles Rohault (1877). Le Latran au Moyen Âge. Paris.
- de Fleury, Charles Rohault (1879). La Sainte Vierge. 2 volumes. Paris: Paris : Librairie Poussielgue frères. – Completed by his son George
- de Fleury, Charles Rohault (1880). Le tabernacle chrétien du 5ème siècle. Arras.
- de Fleury, Charles Rohault (1889). Archéologie chrétienne. 8 volumes. Paris: Librairies-imprimeries réunies.
- de Fleury, Charles Rohault (1898). La Messe, études archéologiques sur ses monuments. Paris.
