= Fleury, Moselle =

Fleury
- Commune
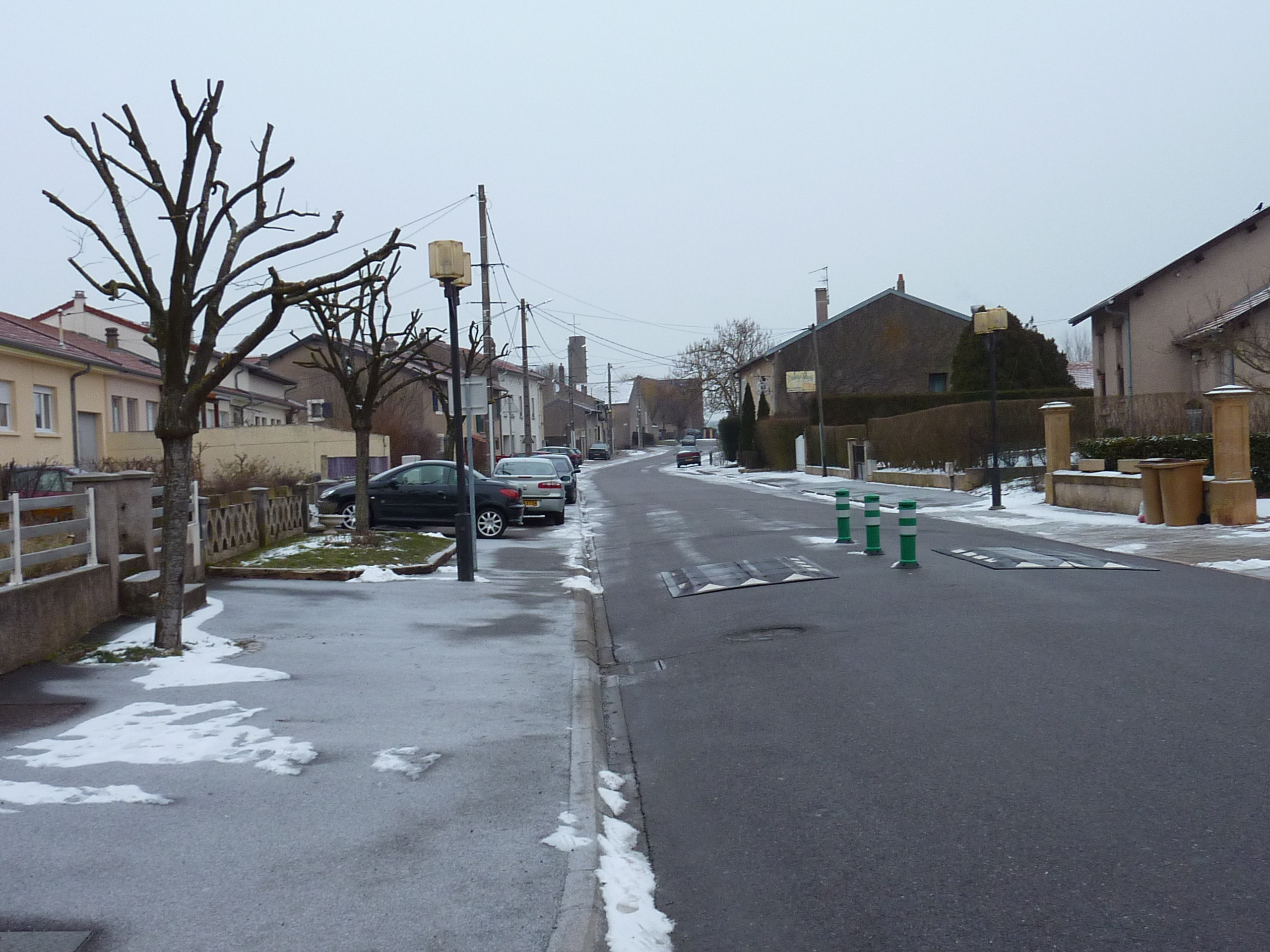
- Gérard Mansion Street in Fleury

- Coat of arms
- Location of Fleury
- Location within France Location within Grand Est
- Coordinates: 49°02′29″N 6°11′44″E
- Country: France
- Region: Grand Est
- Department: Moselle
- Arrondissement: Metz
- Canton: Faulquemont
- Intercommunality: Sud Messin

Government
  - Mayor (2020–2026): Gilles Vavrille
- Area^{1}: 9.71 km^{2} (3.75 sq mi)
- Elevation: 350 m (1,150 ft)
- Highest elevation: 237 m (778 ft)
- Lowest elevation: 170 m (560 ft)
- Population (2023): 1,276
  - Density: 131/km^{2} (340/sq mi)
- Time zone: UTC+01:00 (CET)
  - Summer (DST): UTC+02:00 (CEST)
- INSEE/Postal code: 57218 /57420
- ^{1} French Land Register data, which excludes lakes, ponds, glaciers > 1 km^{2} (0.386 sq mi or 247 acres) and river estuaries.

Fleury (French pronunciation: [flœʁi]; German: Flöringen) is a commune in the Moselle department in Grand Est in north-eastern France.

== Geography ==
The village is sited on a wooded plateau, high above the river Seille. The hilly topography gives rise to a range of microclimates and so agriculture surrounding the village is mixed, featuring arable crops and cattle rearing as well as vineyards.

== History ==
Fleury was located within Saulnois, a region known as a source of salt over many centuries and under the control of the Three Bishoprics province.

Fleury was destroyed in 1352 by the army of the regent of Lorraine.

== See also ==
- Communes of the Moselle department
