= Jean Flory =

John Flory (1886 in Lure, Haute-Saône – 9 May 1949, in Montbéliard) was a French Catholic priest, teacher and resistant. He was archpriest of the Cathedral of Montbéliard. He was a seminarist in Delle and studied theology in Besançon. He was awarded the title "Righteous Among the Nations" and was buried in Thann.

== Biography ==
Jean Flory's family originates from Thann, Haut-Rhin in Alsace.

As a teenager, he was active in the Association Catholique de la Jeunesse Française , and became a seminarian in Delle. He studied theology in Besançon and was ordained on July 30, 1911 as vicar of Saint-Joseph parish in Belfort. In July 1914, he was appointed chaplain of San Luigi dei Francesi (Rome), but following the outbreak of the First World War I he became a Military chaplain in the Chasseurs Alpins from 1914 to 1918.

In 1917 in Seppois-le-Bas, he rescued the Torah scroll from the synagogue destroyed by bombing.

From 1921 to 1937 he was chaplain at the Lycée Victor Hugo in Besançon and with the Jeunesse Étudiante Chrétienne.

From 1937 to 1949, he was archpriest of Saint-Maimbœuf church in Montbéliard, whose Parvise now bears his name.

At Christmas 1942, Jean Flory defied the Germans by recalling the Jewish origins of Jesus, Mary and Joseph, to whom he affixed yellow stars in effigy, and on Prisoners of War Day, he read out from the Pulpit the names of the prisoners, as well as those deported and the Montbéliard Jews deported by the Gestapo.

Jean Flory had suffered from asthma since 1941, and died at the age of 62 on May 9, 1949 in Montbéliard. Among Abbé Flory's alumni were thirty-eight priests, including Pierre Bockel, Righteous Among the Nations from Thann.

== Legacy ==
- He was awarded "Righteous Among the Nations"
- In Montbéliard, the front of the cathedral is named after him
- In Thann, a street is named after him

== Bibliography ==
- (in French) L'Enfant du rire, preface by André Malraux, Grasset, Paris 1973. Reed. 1991, 204 p. (ISBN 9782246003526)
- (in French) Chrétiens et Juifs sous Vichy, 1940-1944 : sauvetage et désobéissance civile, Limore Yagil, Le Cerf ed., Paris, 2005, p. 601 and foll. (ISBN 9782204075855)
- (in French) L'abbé Flory (1886-1949), documents and testimonies gathered by Joseph Ball, 337 p., Besançon, 1978
- (in French) Témoins de l'Évangile : quinze siècles d’écrits spirituels d'auteurs comtois, Jean Thiébaud, preface by Lucien Daloz, L'Harmattan ed., 1999, 390 p. (ISBN 9782738486004)
