= Florey =

Florey may refer to several people:

- Howard Florey, Nobel Prize-winning Australian pharmacologist
  - Electoral district of Florey, is a state electoral district in South Australia named after Florey
- Kitty Burns Florey, American author and editor
- Robert Florey, French screenwriter and film director

== Places ==
Florey may also refer to several places:

- Florey, Australian Capital Territory, suburb of Canberra, Australia named after Howard Florey
- Combe Florey, village in Somerset, England
- Florey (crater), a lunar impact crater on the lunar near side near the northern pole
- Florey, Texas, an unincorporated community in Andrews County, Texas

== other ==
Florey may also refer to several other topics:

- Howard Florey Institute, medical research institute named after Howard Florey
