= Champfleury (disambiguation) =

Champfleury is the pen name of French writer Jules François Felix Fleury-Husson.

Champfleury may also refer to:

- Champfleury, Aube, a French commune
- Champfleury, Marne, a French commune
