= Florrie (disambiguation) =

Florrie (born 1988) is an English pop singer-songwriter, drummer and model.

Florrie is also a nickname for Florence or Flora and may refer to:

== People ==
- Florrie Burke (1918–1995), Irish footballer
- Florrie R. Burke, human rights advocate
- Lady Florence Dixie (1855–1905), British traveller, war correspondent, writer and feminist
- Florrie Dugger, American child actress in the 1976 film Bugsy Malone
- Florrie Evans (1884–1967), Welsh revivalist and missionary
- Florrie Fisher (c. 1918–1972), American speaker, inspiration for Strangers with Candy character Jerri Blank
- Florrie Forde (1875–1940), Australian popular singer and entertainer
- Florrie O'Donoghue (1894–1967), Irish revolutionary
- Florrie O'Mahony (born 1933), Irish hurler
- Florrie Redford (died 1969), English footballer and nurse
- Florrie Rodrigo (1893–1996), Dutch dancer and choreographer

== Fictional characters ==
- Florrie "Flo" Capp, wife of the title character in Andy Capp, a British comic strip
- Florrie Lindley, a former Coronation Street character
- Florrie, a character in the British TV series Fimbles
- Florrie, a character in the TV series Five Minutes More

== See also ==
- The Florence Institute, a school in Liverpool, England, known colloquially as "The Florrie"
