= Georges Rohault de Fleury =

- Born: 23 November 1835; Paris, France
- Died: 12 November 1904 (aged 68); Paris, France
- Occupations: Archaeologist and art historian
- Known for: La Messe, études archéologiques sur ses monuments

Georges Rohault de Fleury (or Rohault de Fleury; 23 November 1835 – 12 November 1904) was a French archaeologist and art historian. He is known for his studies of archaeology and monuments associated with the Christian Mass.

== Youth ==
Georges Rohault de Fleury was born in Paris, France, on 23 November 1835. His father was Charles Rohault de Fleury (1801–1875) and his grandfather Hubert Rohault de Fleury (1777-1846), both architects. As a child he was fascinated by the architectural drawings his grandfather had brought back from his stay in Italy. His elder brother Hubert (1828–1910) became a painter, and was known for sponsoring the Basilica of Sacré-Cœur, Paris.

Georges Rohault de Fleury traveled to Belgium in 1848, to London in 1851 to see The Great Exhibition and to Switzerland in 1852. Georges Rohault de Fleury was admitted to the École nationale supérieure des Beaux-Arts in 1855. At the École des beaux-arts he trained as an architect and made drawings of Parisian monuments, but he never practiced as an architect.

== Career ==
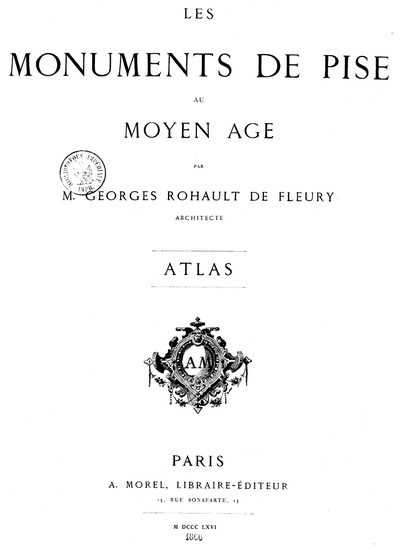
Cover of Les Monuments de Pise au Moyen Âge (1866)

Rohault de Fleury visited Italy with his father in 1858-59, seeing Pisa, Pompeii and Naples. He published his first important monograph in 1866, Les Monuments de Pise au Moyen Age. In 1868, and again in 1869-70, he made trips to Italy. In 1874 he made his last visit to Italy with his father. He exhibited in the Salons of 1863, 1864, 1867 (3rd class medal), 1870 (2nd class medal) and 1874 (1st class medal).

After 1865 Rohault de Fleury assisted his father in his archaeological and religious studies, and arranged for publication of his father's works, some completed after his father had died in 1875. He continued to research archaeology and monuments and to publish writings on his findings throughout his life. Georges Rohault de Fleury died in Paris on 12 November 1904, aged 68.

== Principal publications ==
Other than the works where he assisted his father, the main publications by Georges Rohault de Fleury were:

- "Camposanto de Pise, restauration par le peintre italien Botti". Encyclopédie d'architecture, 2e série. 1863–1864. pp. 303–304.
- "Une visite archéologique à l'île Saint-Honorat". Revue de Cannes: 38–44. 1865.
- Les Monuments de Pise au Moyen Âge. Paris: A. Morel, Libraire-éditeur. 1866. pp. 192.
- Les Monuments de Pise au Moyen Âge. Paris: A. Morel Libraire-éditeur. 1866. pp. 66.
- Visite dans les catacombes de Saint-Calixte sous la conduite de M. le chevalier de Rossi. Paris: Bonaventure et Ducessois. 1866.
- La Toscane au Moyen Âge. Lettres sur l'architecture civile et militaire en 1400. Paris: Vve A. Morel et Compagnie, Libraires-éditeurs. 1874. pp. 394.
- Le Latran au Moyen Âge. Paris: Vve A. Morel et Cie, éditeurs. 1877.
- La Messe, études archéologiques sur ses monuments. Vol. 1–8. Paris: Vve Morel. 1883–1889.
- "Saint-André au Vatican". Nuovo Bullettino de Arch. Crist. II. Rome: 33–39. 1896.
- Gallia Dominicana, Les couvents de saint Dominique au Moyen Âge. 2 volumes. Paris: Lethielleux. 1903.
