= Hubert Rohault de Fleury (painter) =

French painter

Hubert-Jean-Baptiste Rohault de Fleury
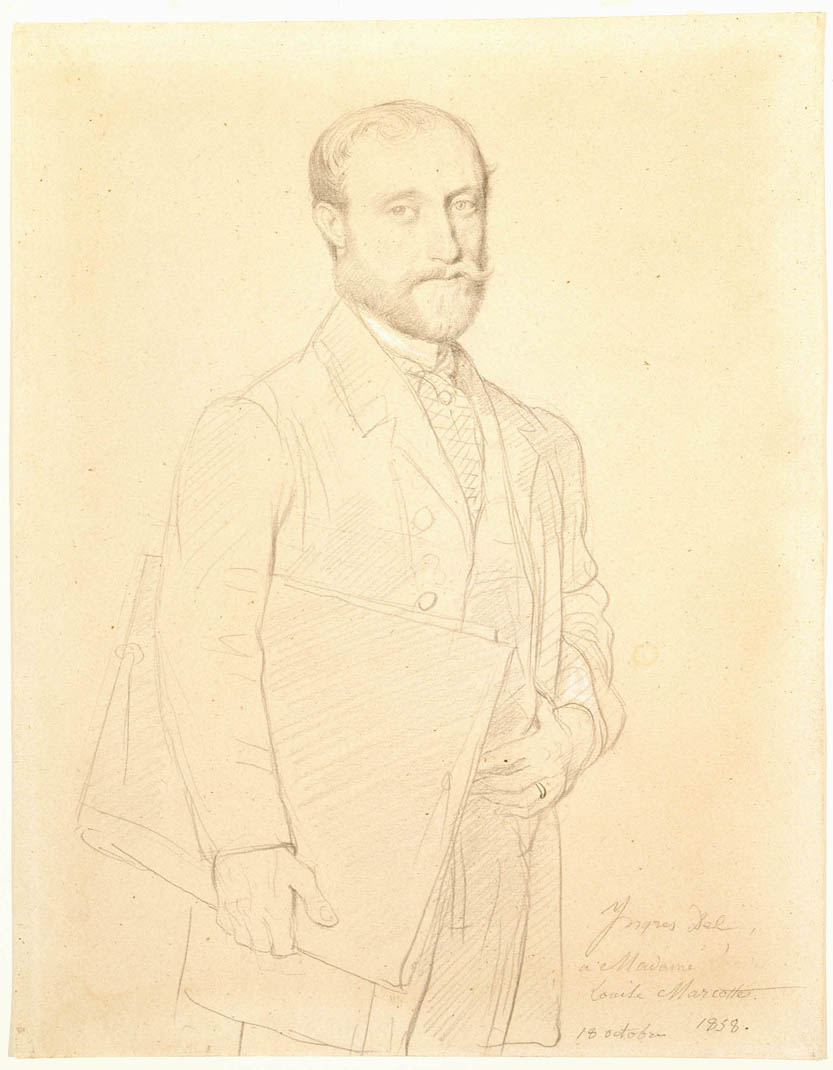
- Hubert Rohault de Fleury in 1858 by Jean Auguste Dominique Ingres
- Born: 26 December 1828; Paris, France
- Died: 11 October 1910 (aged 81); Sceaux, Hauts-de-Seine, France
- Occupation: Painter
- Known for: Philanthropy

Hubert-Jean-Baptiste Rohault de Fleury (26 December 1828 – 11 October 1910) was a French painter and philanthropist. He was one of the initiators of the Basilica of Sacré-Cœur, Paris.

== Life ==
Hubert Rohault de Fleury was born in the 8th arrondissement of Paris on 26 December 1828. His brother was Georges Rohault de Fleury (1835–1904), who shared his deep religious beliefs. Their father was Charles Rohault de Fleury (1801–1875) and their grandfather Hubert Rohault de Fleury (1777–1846), both architects. His mother died in 1840, and his adolescence was difficult. At the age of 16 he gained permission from his father to join the merchant marine as an apprentice officer.

He traveled from Le Havre to Réunion, Calcutta, and Jakarta. After returning, he signed up for a voyage to Martinique and Haiti. On returning he resumed his studies of mathematics, planning to study at the École Polytechnique, but was unable to do so due to the French Revolution of 1848. In November 1848 he became an apprentice officer in the navy, and was sent to Panama where he came under the wing of the commandant Belvèze, an old family friend. He helped with the transport of troops to Italy in 1849.

Rohault de Fleury was not satisfied with the seagoing life. He tried to go into business but failed. He became absorbed in painting and drawing, which became a lifetime occupation. He met Louise Marcotte, and they were married at Notre Dame de Lorette in 1857. Louise Marie Chantal Marcotte (1833–1873) was the second daughter of Charles Marcotte d'Argenteuil, the friend and benefactor of Jean Auguste Dominique Ingres. Ingres drew a portrait of Louise Marie in 1868, and ten years later drew a portrait of Hubert Rohault de Fleury. A first child, Jacques, was born in 1858. Louise had a miscarriage in 1862, then gave birth to Charlotte in 1864. After this they decided to have no more children.

Rohault de Fleury became increasingly involved in the religious life. He exhibited once at the Salon in 1863 and was well-received, but although he continued to paint he did not attempt to sell his work. At the start of the Franco-Prussian War (1870–1871) Hubert Rohault de Fleury and Alexandre Legentil vowed to finance construction of the Sacré-Coeur Basilica if France was spared from assault. Despite the defeat of France, the country was not invaded and occupied. After the situation had calmed down, Legentil and Rohault de Fleury, who were brothers-in-law, soon obtained approval for the project from the Catholic Church. It was taken up with enthusiasm by Cardinal Joseph-Hippolyte Guibert, the new archbishop of Paris. Work on the basilica started in 1875 to a design by Paul Abadie.

Rohault de Fleury's wife died in 1873 and his father died in 1875. He dedicated the remainder of his life to the construction of Sacré Coeur. Falling ill in 1905 he retired to his daughter's home in Sceaux, where he died in 1910.

== Selected publications ==
Hubert Rohault de Fleury was the author of the following publications:

- Souvenirs de 1870–1871, par H. Rohault de Fleury National Library of France
- Historique de la basilique du Sacré-Coeur, pièces et documents réunis par H. Rohault de Fleury, ... Tome IV. 1891–1895 National Library of France
- Basilique du Sacré-Coeur de Jésus à Montmartre National Library of France
- Un nouvel exploit de Mlle Jacqueline. [Par H. Rohaut de Fleury.] National Library of France
- Le Commandant de Belvèze. Lettres choisies dans sa correspondance. 1824–1875. (Publiées par Hubert et Georges Rohault de Fleury.) National Library of France
- Quelques histoires, par H. Rohault de Fleury (1) National Library of France
