= Hubert Rohault de Fleury (architect) =

French architect

Charles Hubert Rohault de Fleury
- Born: July 2, 1777
- Died: 1846
- Occupation: Architect

Charles Hubert Rohault de Fleury (2 July 1777 – 1846) was a French architect who was responsible for many public buildings in Paris in the first half of the 19th century.

== Early years ==
The Rohault family originated in Abbeville. Jean-Baptiste Louis Rohault, a cloth and silk merchant, established himself in Paris on the rue Saint-Honoré in the middle of the 18th century. He married into the nobility. His son, Hubert Jean-Baptiste Rohault de Fleury, born in 1750, was an advocate of the Parliament of Paris and keeper of the records of the Company of the Indies. Charles Hubert Rohault de Fleury was one of his two sons, born on 2 July 1777. His brother, Baron Hubert Rohault de Fleury, had a distinguished military career.

Charles Hubert Rohault de Fleury entered the École polytechnique in October 1794, where he elected to study architecture. He was among the first group of students at the institute, which had just been established by the Convention. He was taught by Jean-Louis-Nicolas Durand, a theoretician who had great influence on several generations of architects through his teaching and writings. Durand was the author of Précis des leçons. Rohault de Fleury later wrote that Durand had drummed into him that beauty in architecture came from economy combined with convenience.

In 1800 Rohault de Fleury won a grand prize in architecture from the Institute of Sciences and Arts, and in 1802 won the first grand prize, the Prix de Rome, which let him travel to Rome. His prize was awarded for the design of a fairground on the banks of a river in a city. While functional, the design drew on classical elements of the Doric and Corinthian orders. He studied in Rome between 1803 and 1806, at the same time as Auguste-Victor Grandjean de Montigny and Auguste Famin, and developed a pronounced taste for Italian architecture.

== Career ==
On his return from Italy in 1806 Rohault de Fleury was named inspector of works of the Arc de Triomphe in the Place de l'Étoile. In 1812 he was named commissioner of roads at the prefecture of police, holding this position until 1840, when he became inspector general of this service. In 1819 Rohault de Fleury was named an honorary member of the council of civil buildings. He began the Code de la voire (street regulations), which was completed by his son, Charles. In 1821 and 1822 the council of civil buildings proposed, based on Hubert's report, regulations that did not limit the width of streets but that required that they be in proportion to the height of the buildings.

Hubert Rohault de Fleury was an architect of hospices in Paris from 1817 to 1833. In 1821 he was made responsible for the gendarmerie and fire brigade barracks, and for the halls and markets of the city. In this position he designed the fish and butter markets in 1821, the fire brigade barracks in the rue de la Paix (1823), conversion of the old hotel of the Marshall d'Ancre into a gendarmerie barracks (1823) and the barracks of the Republican Guard on rue Mouffetard (1824). This last was completed by his son Charles Rohault de Fleury, who was also an architect. The barracks on rue Mouffetard are his best-known work, and show his love of Italian architecture.

In 1824 Rohault de Fleury was named inspector general of civil buildings in the departments, and became a member of the council of civil buildings. In the late 1820s he restored the chapel of the Orphelins. He was made a knight of the Legion of Honour in 1828. In 1828 he was made inspector general of the first division of civil buildings of Paris and also placed in charge of the barracks of the municipal guard and the fire brigade, holding this position until 1837. In 1832 he was named architect for the city's markets.

Hubert Rohault de Fleury died in 1846. The drawings he brought back from Italy fascinated his grandson Georges Rohault de Fleury, who became a distinguished writer on Italian monuments.
