= Hubert Rohault de Fleury (soldier) =

French soldier (1779–1866)

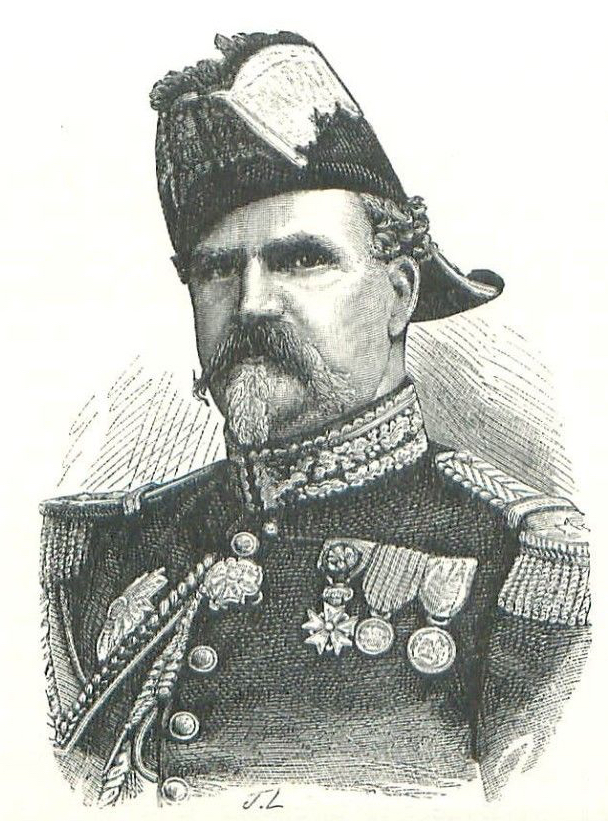
- Born: 2 April 1779; Paris, France
- Died: 21 September 1866 (aged 87); Montoire-sur-le-Loir, Loir-et-Cher, France
- Occupation: Soldier
- Known for: Fortifications

General Baron Hubert Rohault de Fleury (2 April 1779 – 21 September 1866) was a French soldier who played a major role in the fortifications of Lyon.

== Origins ==
The Rohault family originated in Abbeville. Jean-Baptiste Louis Rohault, a cloth and silk merchant, established himself in Paris on the rue Saint-Honoré in the middle of the 18th century. He married into the nobility. His son, Hubert Jean-Baptiste Rohault de Fleury, born in 1750, was an advocate of the Parliament of Paris and keeper of the records of the Company of the Indies. Hubert Jean-Baptiste had two sons. Charles Hubert Rohault de Fleury was born on 2 July 1777, and went on to become a prominent architect. Hubert Rohault de Fleury was born in Paris in 1779. He attended the College of Juilly. At the age of 16, he entered the École Polytechnique and graduated in 1798. He entered the School of Engineering at Metz and left the school in 1800 as a lieutenant.

== Military career ==
During the Napoleonic Wars, Hubert Rohault de Fleury was promoted to captain in 1801, and served in the campaign in Portugal, then was transferred to Boulogne. He joined the Army of Germany and fought in the Battle of Austerlitz in 1805. During this campaign, he was attached to the corps of Marshall Jean Lannes, who tried to obtain his promotion to battalion commander. This was rejected by General Henri Gatien Bertrand, who considered that he was too young for such a senior rank. Rohault de Fleury fought at the Battle of Jena in 1806. He assisted in the sieges of Stralsund and Colberg.In 1808, he was sent to Catalonia. After the defense of Barcelona, he was named battalion commander at the start of 1809. He was made an officer of the Legion of Honour in 1809 at the Third Siege of Gerona, where he led the first assault on the fort of Montjouy and was seriously wounded. He was made a lieutenant-colonel in 1814.

After the fall of Napoleon, Rohault de Fleury gave his allegiance to Louis XVIII and remained faithful to the King during the Hundred Days in 1815. He was promoted to colonel in 1816, and for six year commanded the 2nd Engineers Regiment. In 1822, he was appointed deputy governor of the École Polytechnique, but did not hold this position for long. He was promoted to brigadier general in 1823, in command of the engineers of the Army of Catalonia under Marshall Moncey.

After the July Monarchy was established in 1830, Rohault de Fleury was named senior commander of the defensive works of Lyon. The goal was to create an immense fortified place that could serve as a military capital and place of refuge for the government of France in the event of the loss of Paris. He adapted and extended the works started by General Haxo, adding a series of new forts and fortification works. In 1831 and again in April 1834, he was involved in suppression of the Canut revolts in Lyon. In 1837, he participated in the capture of Constantine, Algeria as commander of the engineers.

He was appointed to the Chambre de Pairs (House of Lords) in 1837, but his military duties left him little time to attend the sessions of the house.

Hubert Rohault de Fleury died in 1866.

== Fortifications of Lyon ==
Fortifications of Lyon

The extensive system of fortifications of Lyon included:

1. Fort de la Duchère
2. Fort de Caluire
3. Fort de Montessuy
4. Redoute Bel-Air
5. Fort de Sainte-Foy
6. Lunette du Petit Sainte-Foy
7. Fort Saint-Irénée
8. Lunette du Fossoyeur
9. Fort de Loyasse
10. Fort de Vaise
11. Fort Saint-Jean
12. Bastion Saint-Laurent
13. Redoute du Haut-Rhône
14. Redoute de la Tête d'Or
15. Lunette des Charpennes
16. Fort des Brotteaux
17. Redoute de la Part-Dieu
18. Fort Montluc
19. Redoute des Hirondelles
20. Fort Lamothe
21. Fort du Colombier
22. Fort de la Vitriolerie

The fortifications of Lyon were improved according to Rohault de Fleury's plans. The existing Croix-Rousse fort retained its layout, but the bastion of St-Jean on the Saône side was made into a powerful artillery position. The Fourvière fort was rebuilt from 1834 to 1838, and the outworks progressively improved until 1854. On the right bank of the Saône the fortifications were Sainte-Foy, now the CRS barracks, Petit Sainte-Foy, Saint-Irénée (1831), Vaise (1835), Loyasse (1838) and Duchère (1844), now disappeared. Between the Saône and the Rhône, in front of the Croix-Rousse fortification were the forts of Caluire (1831), now replaced by the stade Henri Cochet, and Montessuy (1831).

Fortifications on the left bank of the Rhône were the haut-Rhône battery (1854), demolished fifteen years later, and the forts of Brotteaux (1831), Villeurbanne or Montluc (1831 – now a police station), Tête d'Or (1832) and Charpennes (1842). The Colombier fort (1831) was demolished. The La Motte fort (1832), adapted from the Château de La Motte, was later transformed into a barracks and then became the "Parc Blandan". Of the Vitriolerie fort (1840) on the bank of the Rhone, only the fortified barracks in the middle of the Général Frère neighborhood remains.

== Selected publications ==
Publications by Rohault de Fleury include:

- Journal de l'expédition de Constantine en 1837 National Library of France
- Chambre des Pairs. Séance du 30 mars 1841. Opinion de M. le baron Rohault de Fleury,... sur le projet de loi relatif aux fortifications de Paris National Library of France
- Rapport fait à la Chambre par M. le baron Rohault de Fleury, au nom d'une commission spéciale chargée de l'examen du projet de loi relatif à l'ouverture d'un crédit de 3.930.000 francs pour la construction de divers ponts National Library of France
- Opinion de M. le bon Rohault de Fleury,... sur le projet de loi relatif aux fortifications de Paris National Library of France
- Opinion de M. le baron Rohault de Fleury, pair de France, sur le projet de loi relatif aux fortifications de Paris National Library of France
- Chambre des Pairs. Séance du 30 mars 1841. Opinion de M. le baron Rohault de Fleury, pair de France, sur le projet de loi relatif aux fortifications de Paris
