= Fort de Loyasse =

Fort de Loyasse Fort Blandan
- Lyon
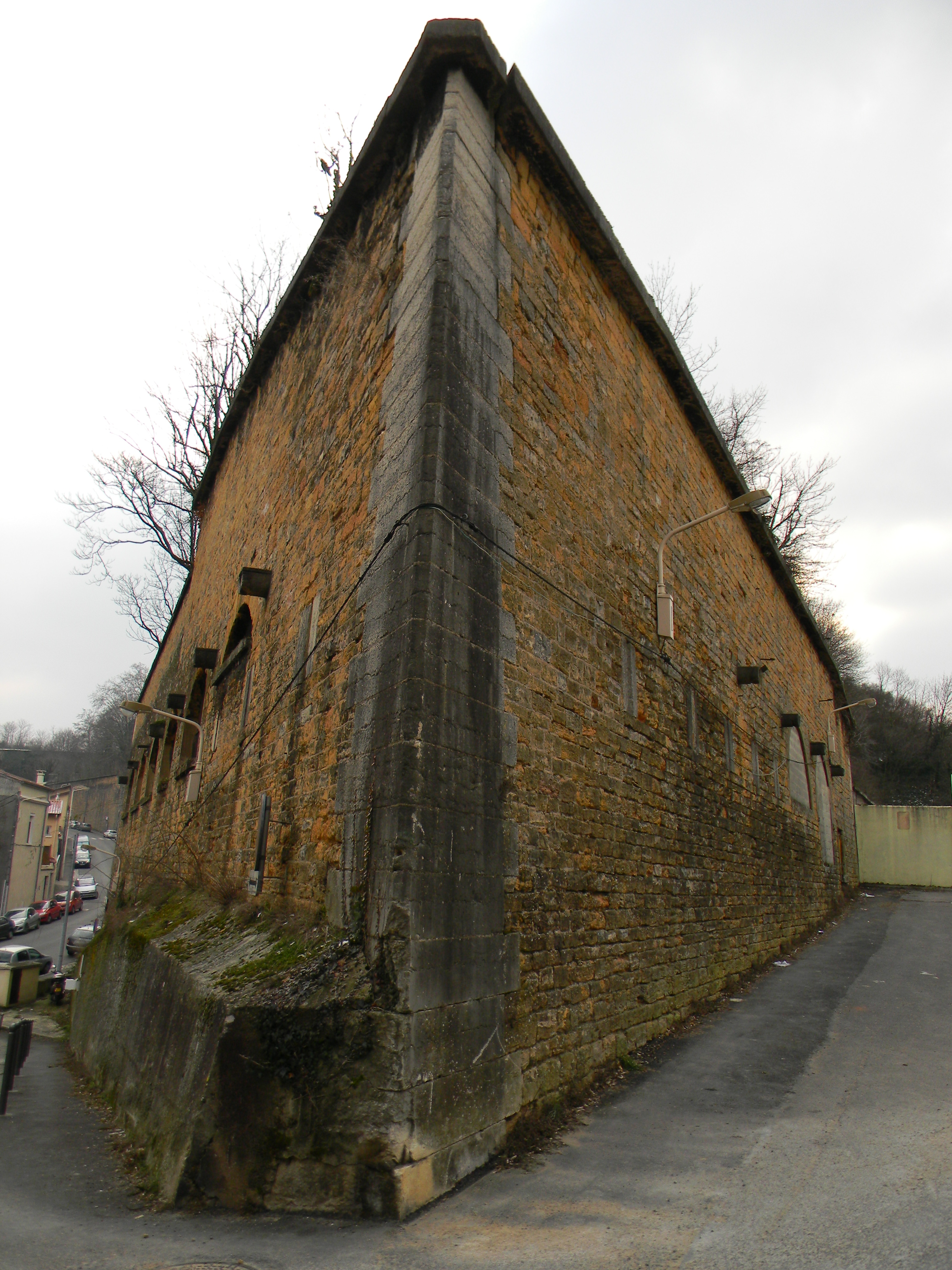
- North Angle of fort de Loyasse

Site information
- Type: Fort

Location
- Coordinates: 45.766°N 4.809°E

Site history
- Built: 1840

Fort de Loyasse is a fort built between 1836 and 1840. It is currently in the 9th arrondissement of Lyon and is part of the first belt of forts protecting Lyon.

The fort is a sister fort to Fort de Caluire and Fort Duchère (both since demolished) and Fort Saint-Jean.

== History ==
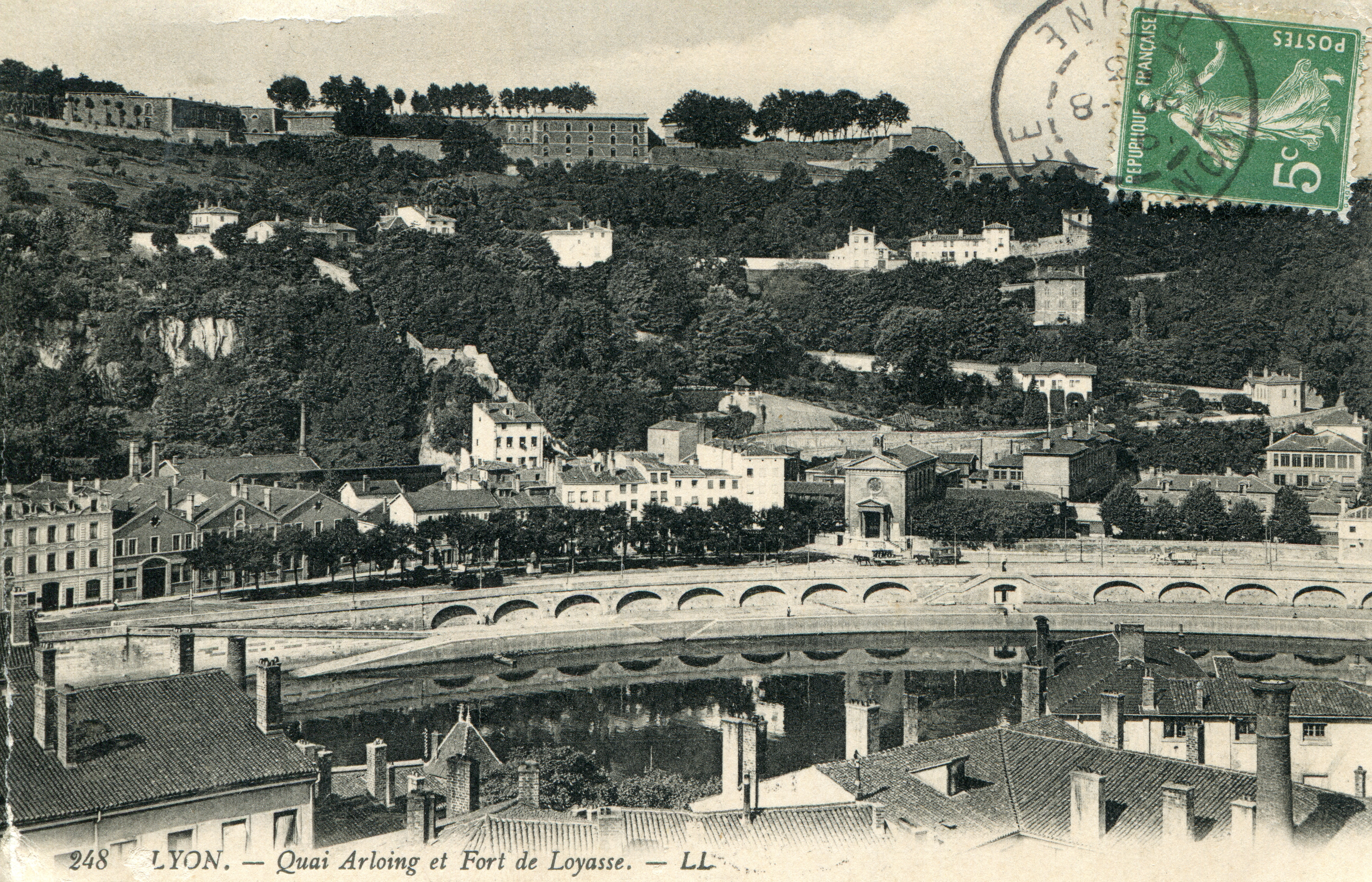
The fort of Loyasse on a postcard at the beginning of the 20th century

Built in 1836–1840 as a result of the July Revolution and resulting fears of an invasion of France by Austria, the Fort de Loyasse was intended to protect the city from invaders from the east. This fort and the Fort de Vaise are located on the site of the former walled area of the Py.

The invention in 1858 of rifled bores replaced Smooth-bore rifles, and extended the reach of projectiles to 2,500 m. Then melinite replaced gunpowder in 1885, which increased the blast of explosions, and forts of the Loyasse generation became obsolete.

The fort was used in World War I to house prisoners of war; during the Second World War it was occupied by the Germans. The fort was completely decommissioned by the military on 15 October 1947. Lyon acquired the land of the fort in 1949 at auction for 1,200,000 francs and used it as a roads department warehouse, a glacis, and allotment gardens still being cultivated today. The fort's underground galleries temporarily served as a mushroom farm.

A barracks of the fort was demolished in the 1960s to expand the Montée de l'Observance, a city street; the trenchwork of the fort allowed construction of a boulevard linking the new district of L'Observance to the Vaise neighbourhood in 1961.

== Architecture ==
Unlike many other forts of the first belt, Loyasse is designed as a mountain fort: the glacis around the fort are very inclined.

The fort consisted of two superimposed platforms along the slope:

- on the lower part, the working face is composed of three bastions
- on the upper part, there are two bastions and a cavalier
- between the two levels were two barracks, storerooms, wells, latrines and a gunpowder magazine .

The functional range of the Fort de Loyasse smooth-bore guns was 1,200m.

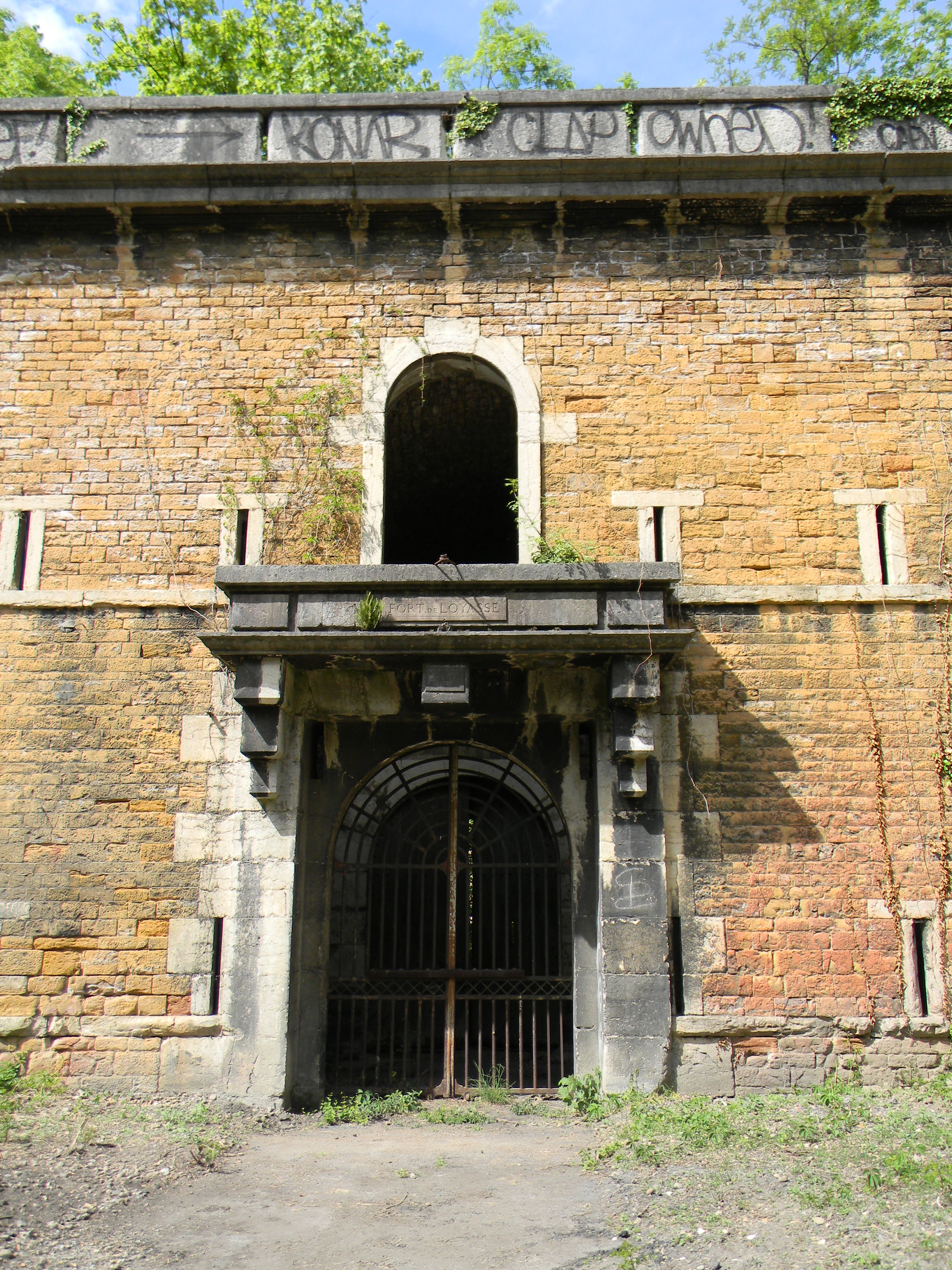
Entrance to the fort

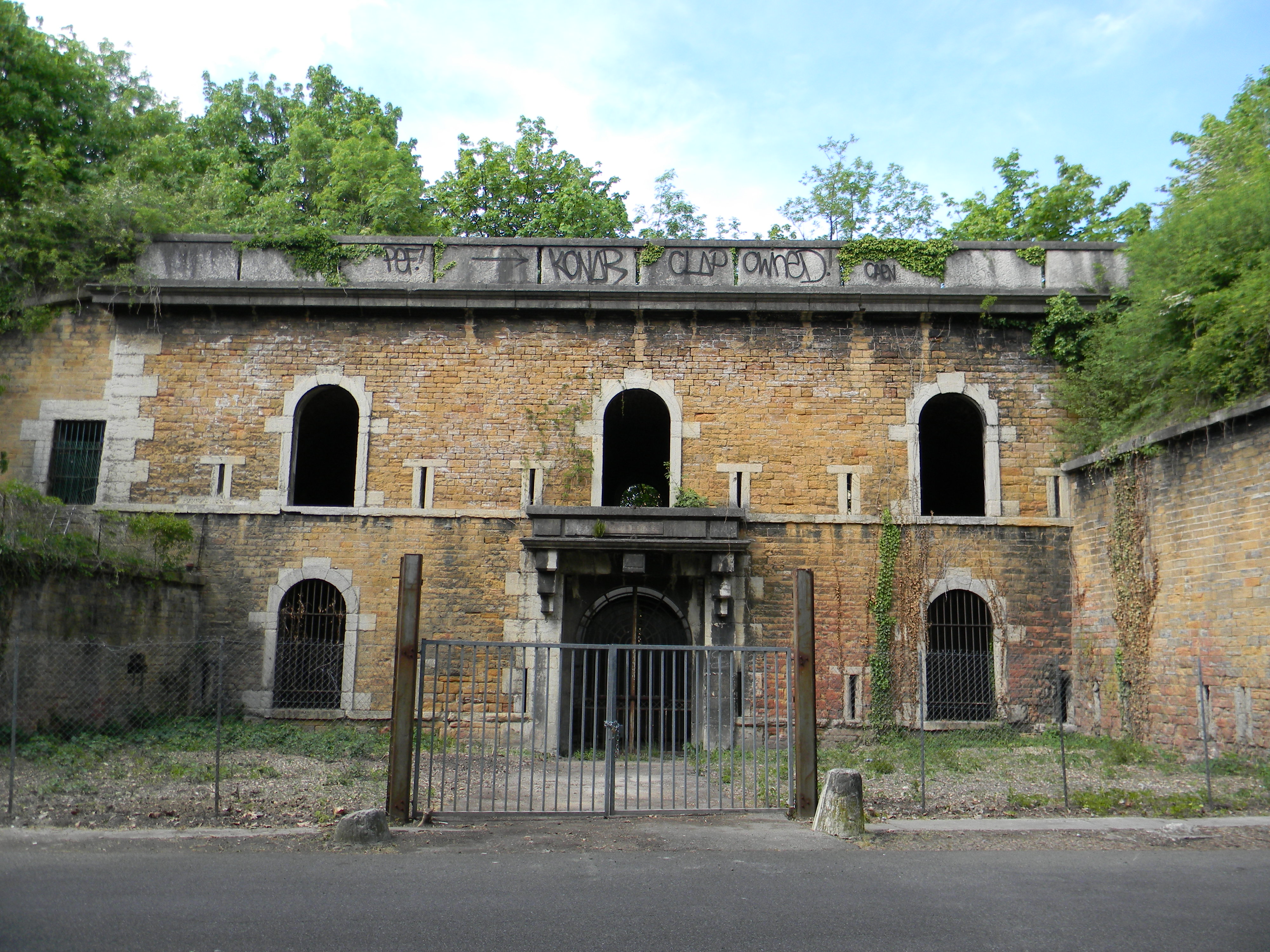
The barracks and cavalier

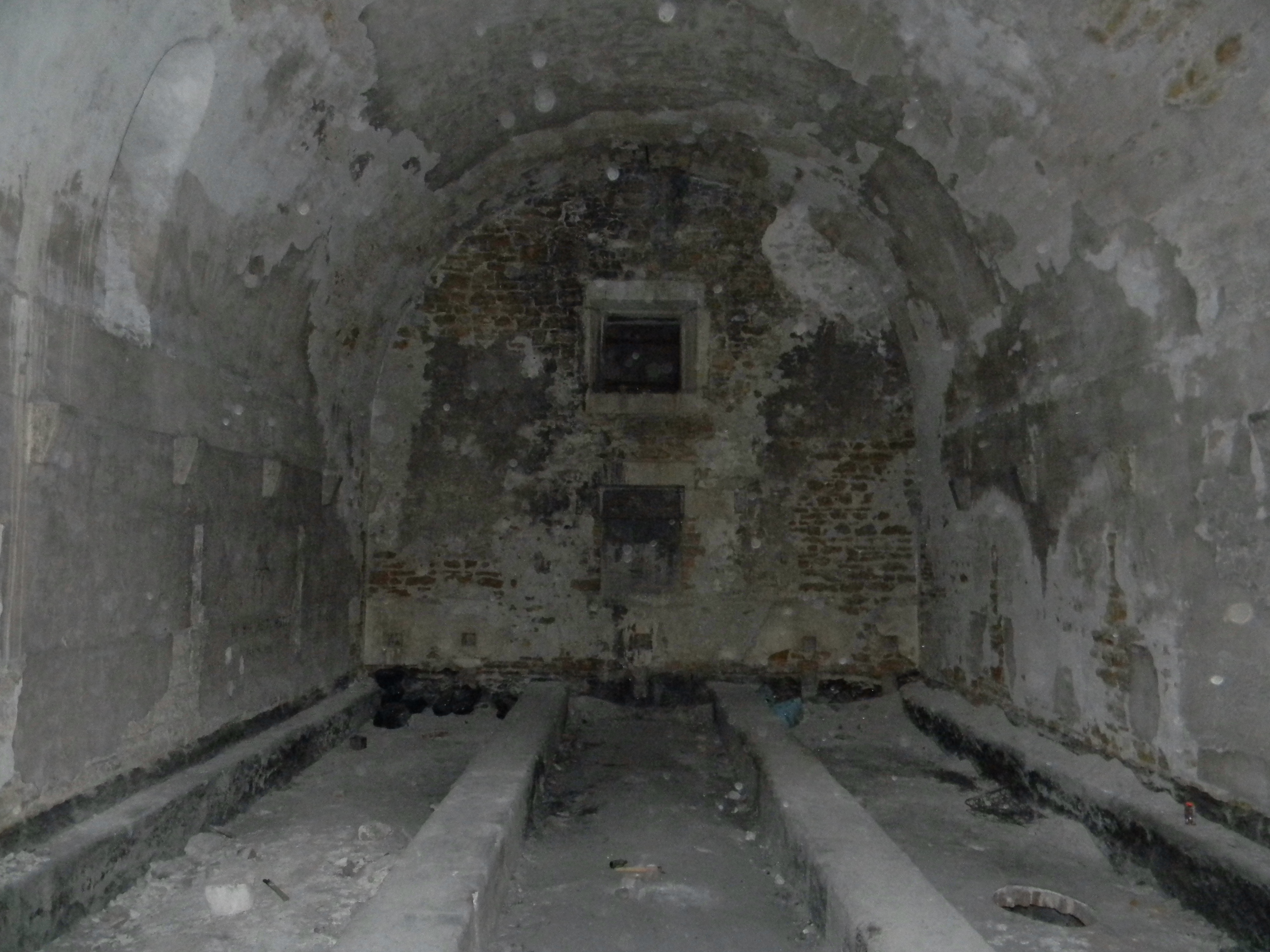
Interior view of the gunpowder magazine

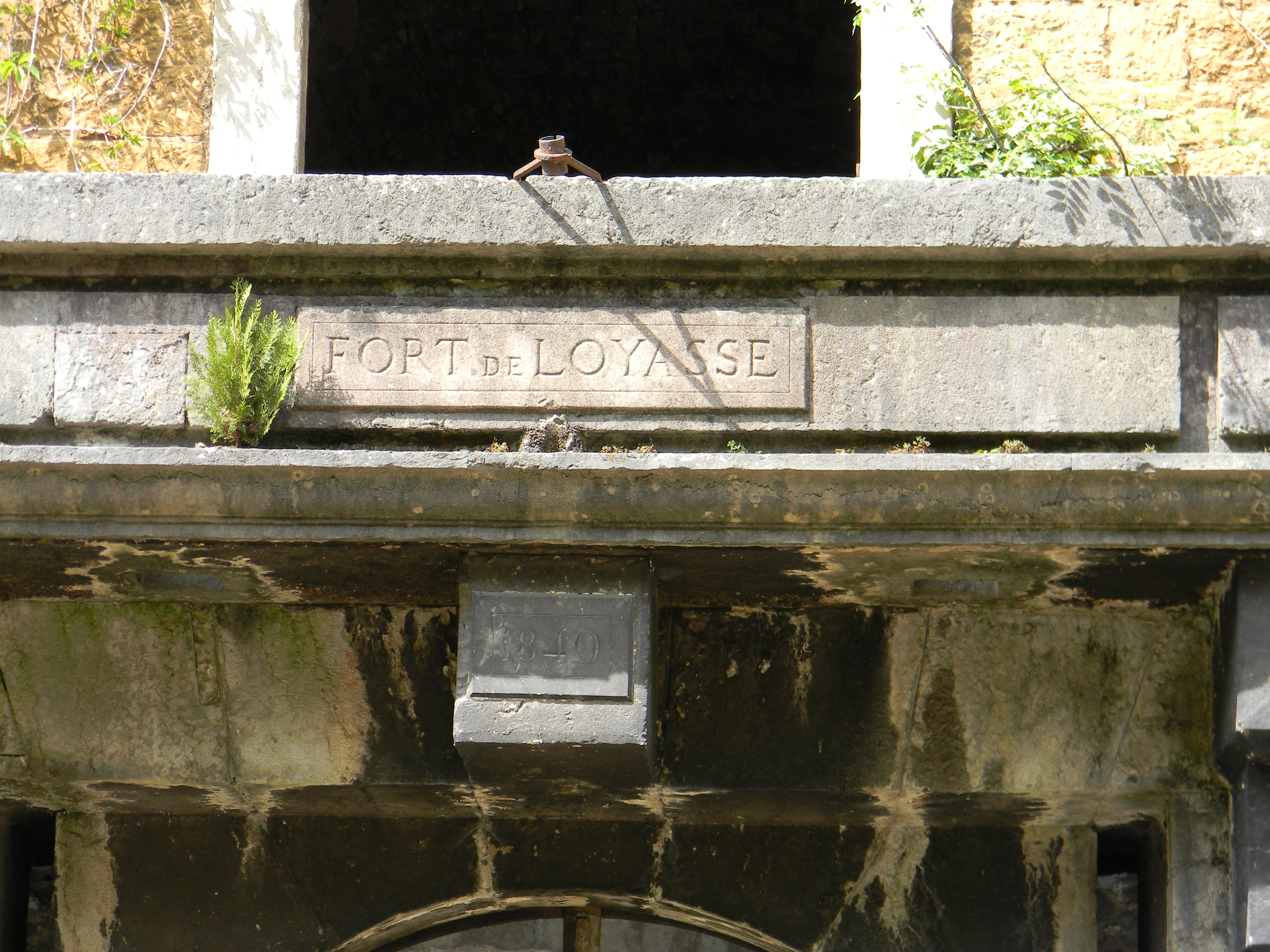
Pediment and year of completion plaque

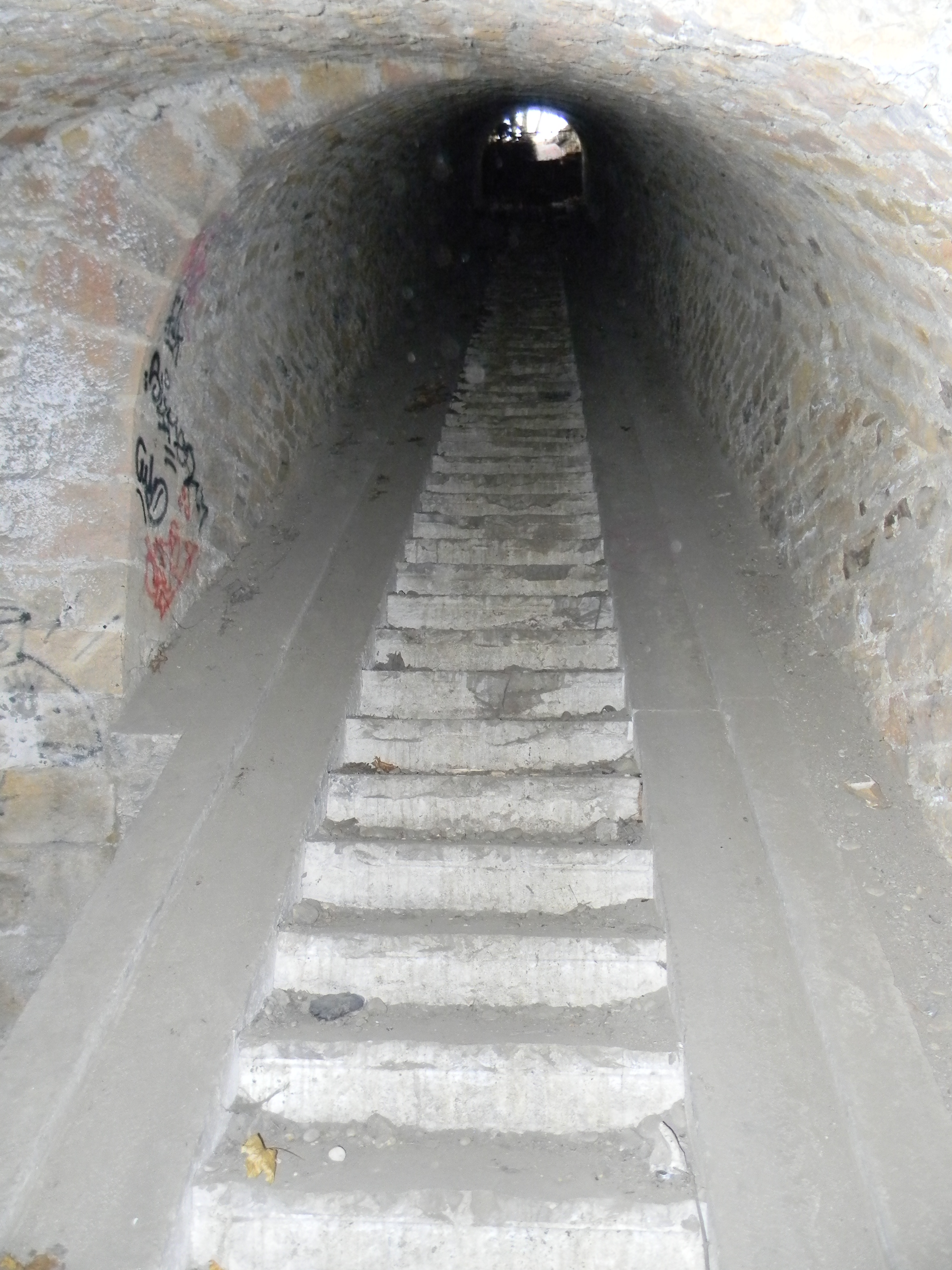
A staircase with ramps for pulling up artillery

== Media ==
The novel Le crime de Loyasse de Bernard Domeyne starts with the fictional story of a body discovered in the fort.

A scene of the film Lucie Aubrac (1997) by Claude Berri has been linked to the fort de Loyasse.

== See also ==
- Ceintures de Lyon

== Bibliography ==
- Dallemagne, François (2006), Éditions Lyonnaises d'Art et d'Histoire (ed.), Les défenses de Lyon: enceintes et fortifications (in French), Georges Fessy(photographer), Lyon, p. 109, ISBN 2-84147-177-2
- Jacquemet, Dominique; Lanneau, Jean-Paul; Douai, S.; Richard, J-P (2010), CIL Vaise (ed.), Au Bois de la Claire: spécial Fort de Loyasse (in French), Jean-Paul Lanneau(photographer), Lyon, ISSN 1281-2684
