= Fort de Caluire =

- Caluire-et-Cuire
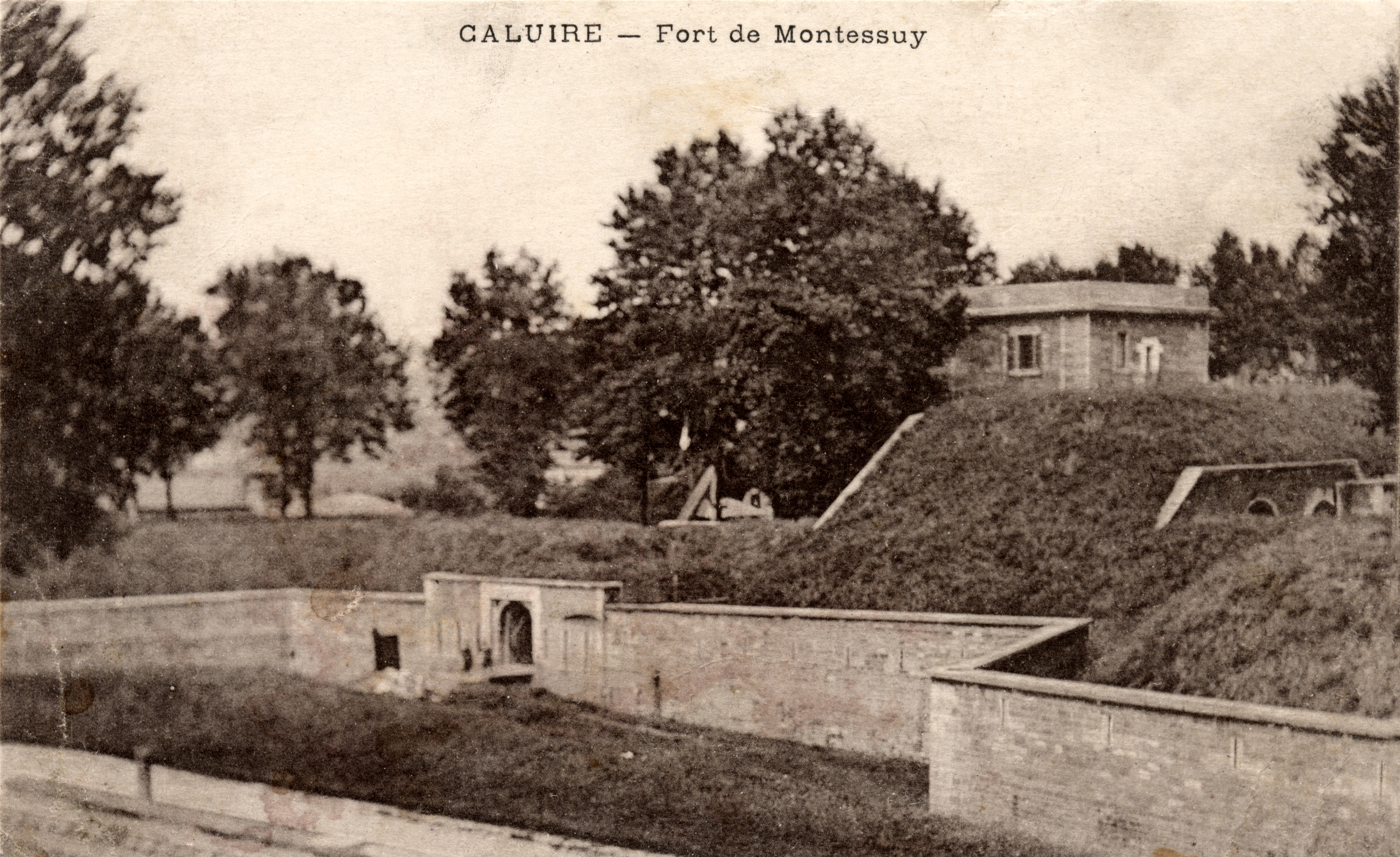
- Entrance of fort

Site information
- Type: Fort

Location
- Location within France
- Coordinates: 45.793°N 4.837°E

Site history
- Built: 1831
- Architect: Hubert Rohault de Fleury (soldier)
- In use: 1933

Fort de Caluire (French pronunciation: [fɔʁ də kalɥiʁ]) was an old fortification situated in Caluire-et-Cuire. Now demolished, it was part of the first belt of forts protecting Lyon.

== History ==
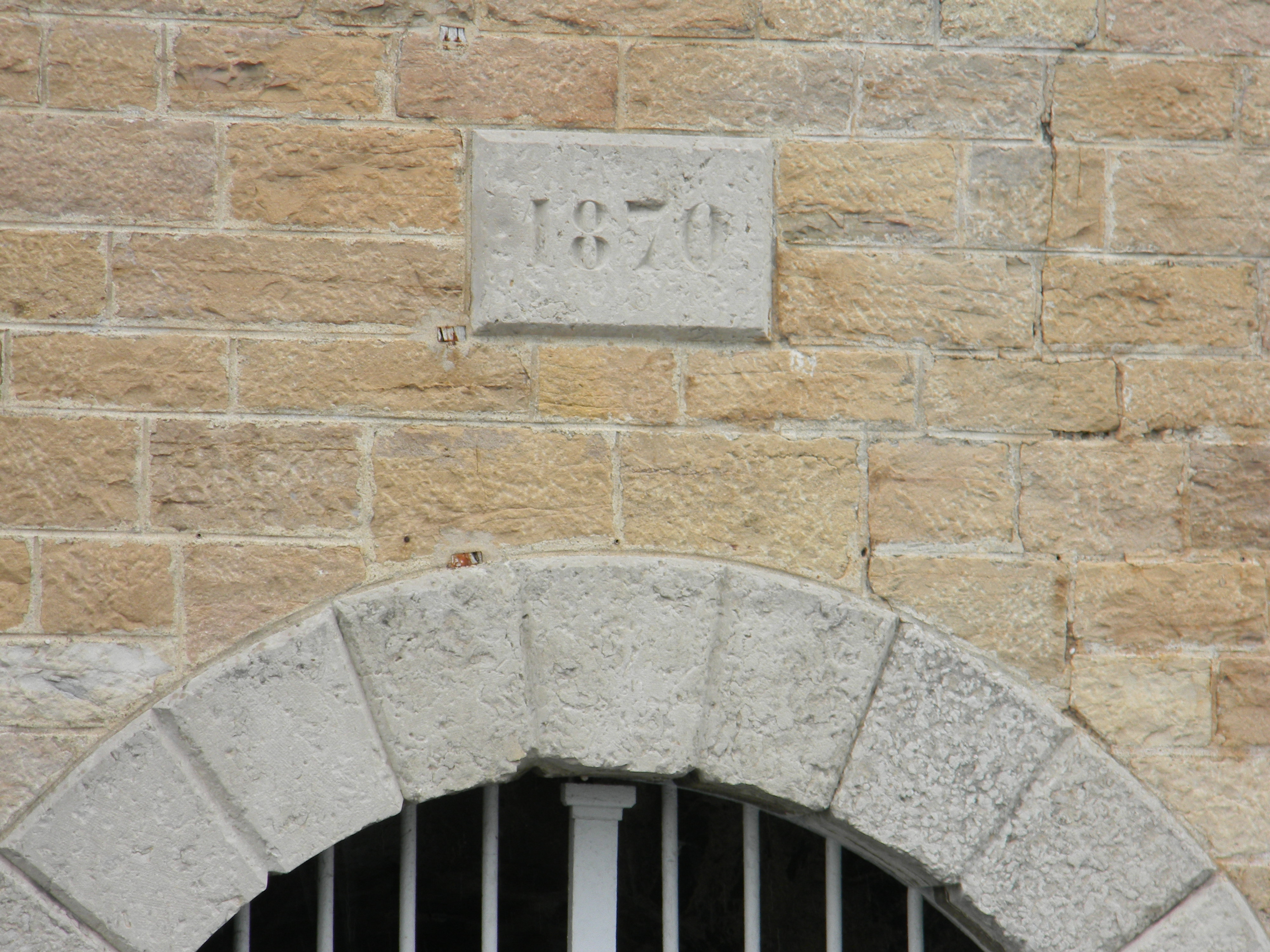
Fronton at the entrance of the Mushroom Farm

Built in 1831, it was connected to the Fort de Montessuy by a long chamber, from which it defended the approaches to the Croix-Rousse along the road from the Dombes.

Placed on the slope of the Saône it defended the river, along with Fort de Loyasse, Fort Duchère and Fort Saint-Jean. It was square, with a bastion at each corner.

In the 1860s a mushroom farm operated in the underground enclosure connecting the two forts, with the old bastions repurposed into underground grow-rooms.

== Today ==
The fort was demolished in 1933 to make way for the construction of the current Henri Cochet stadium. A few clues remain as to its location such as the present street known as the montée (rise or climb) des Forts; the entrance to fort de Caluire was at the current intersection of montée des Forts and avenue Paul Doumer.

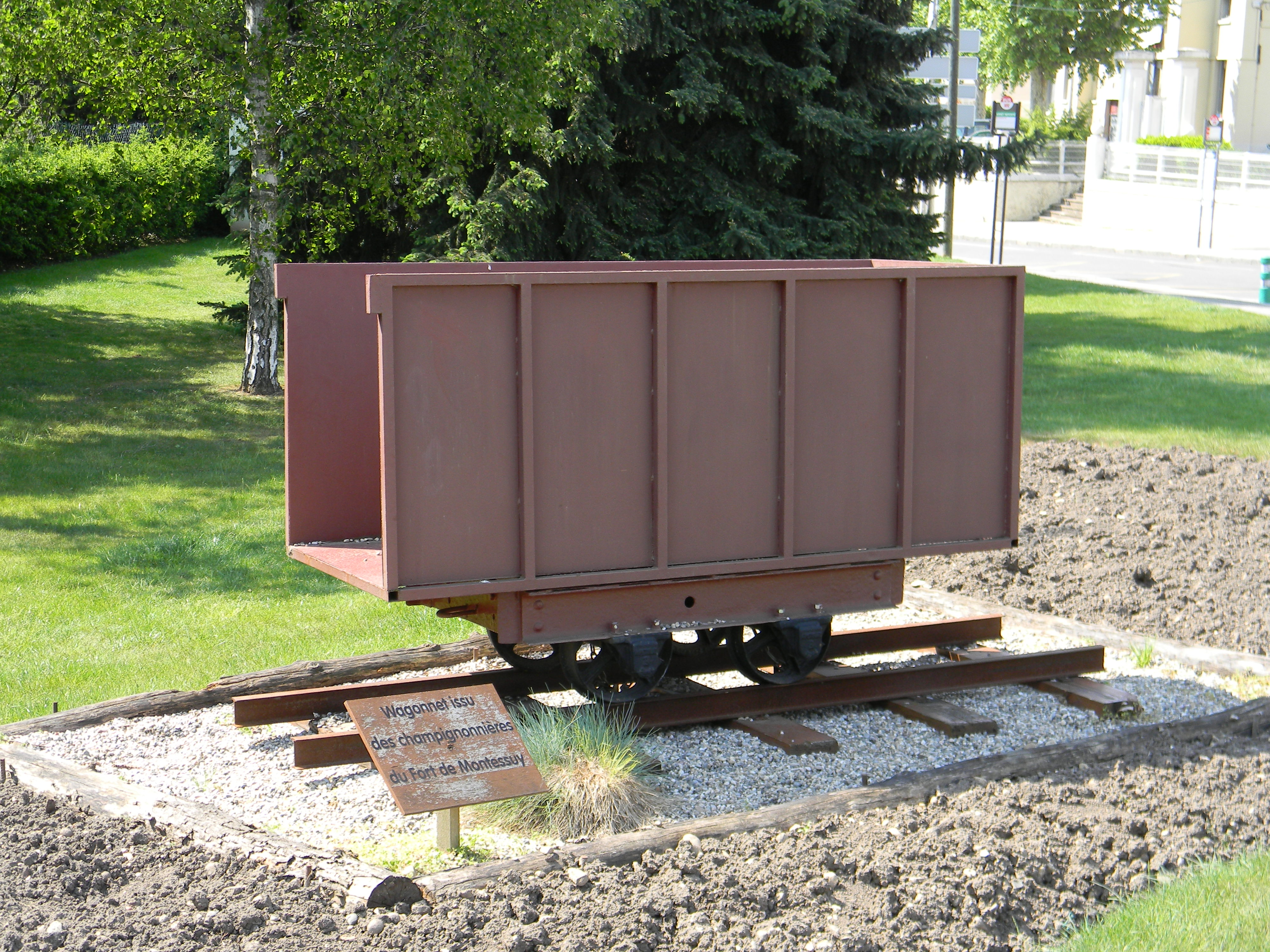
Wagon from the mushroom farm

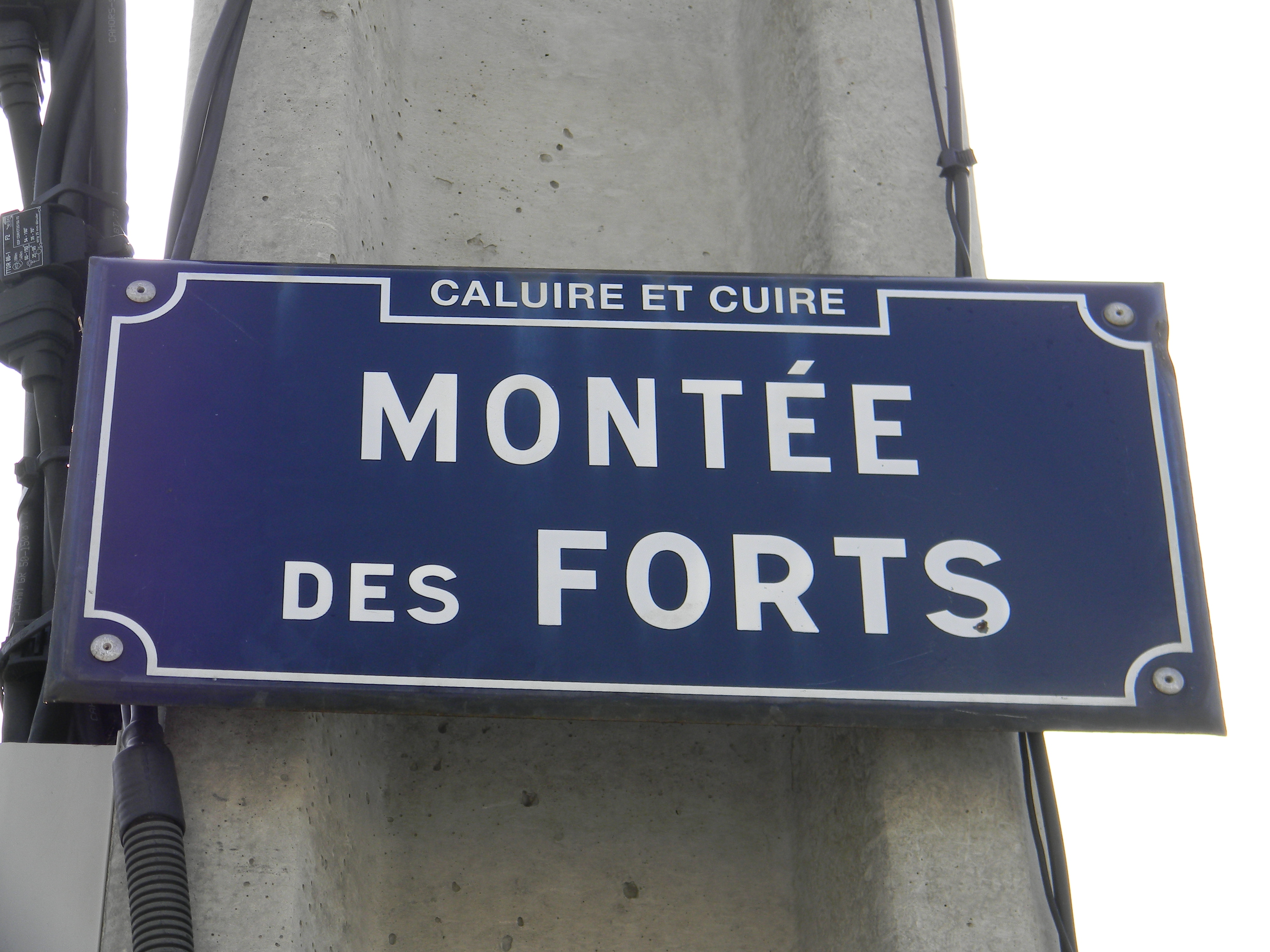
Street sign

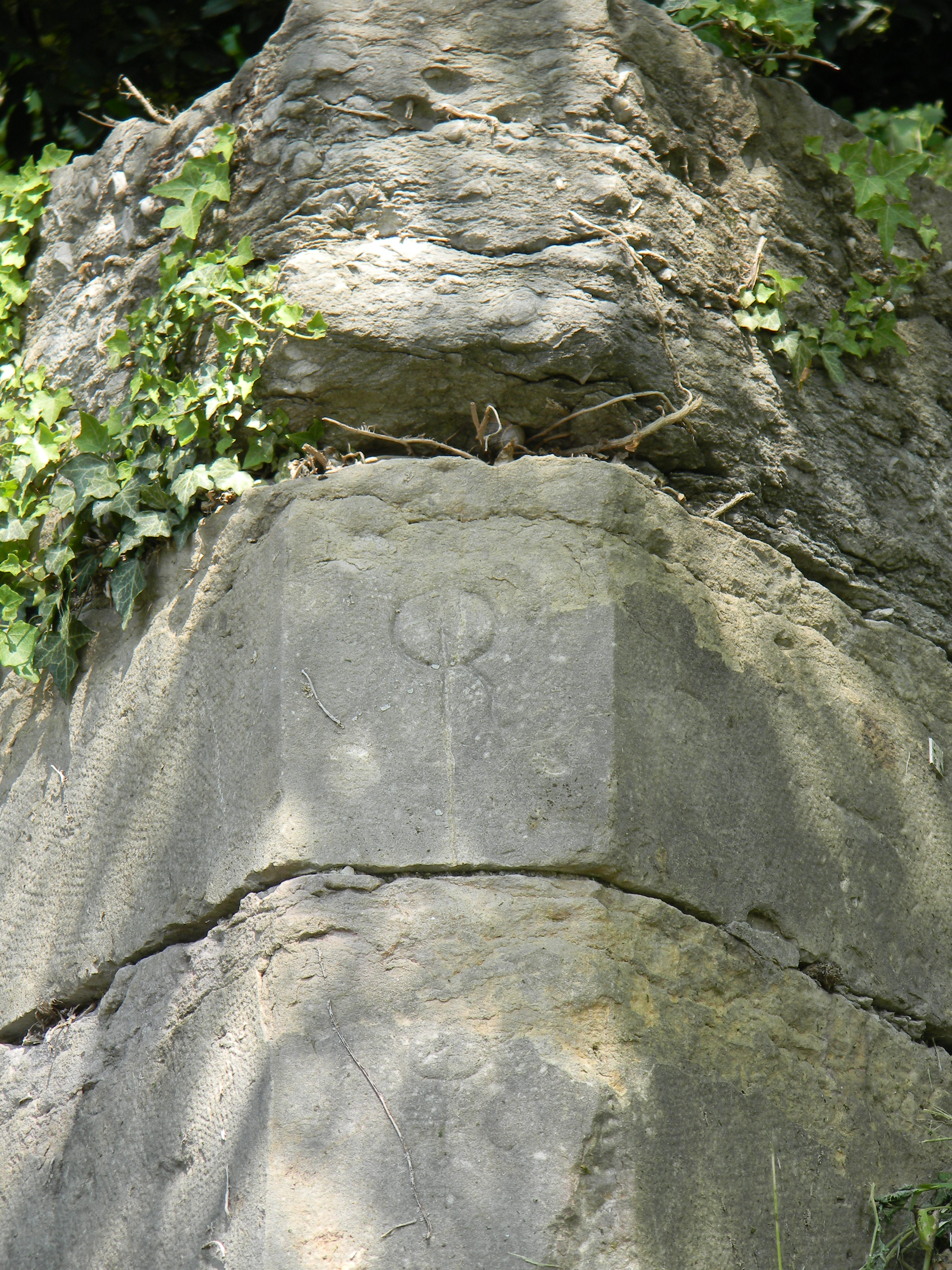
Traces of the fort

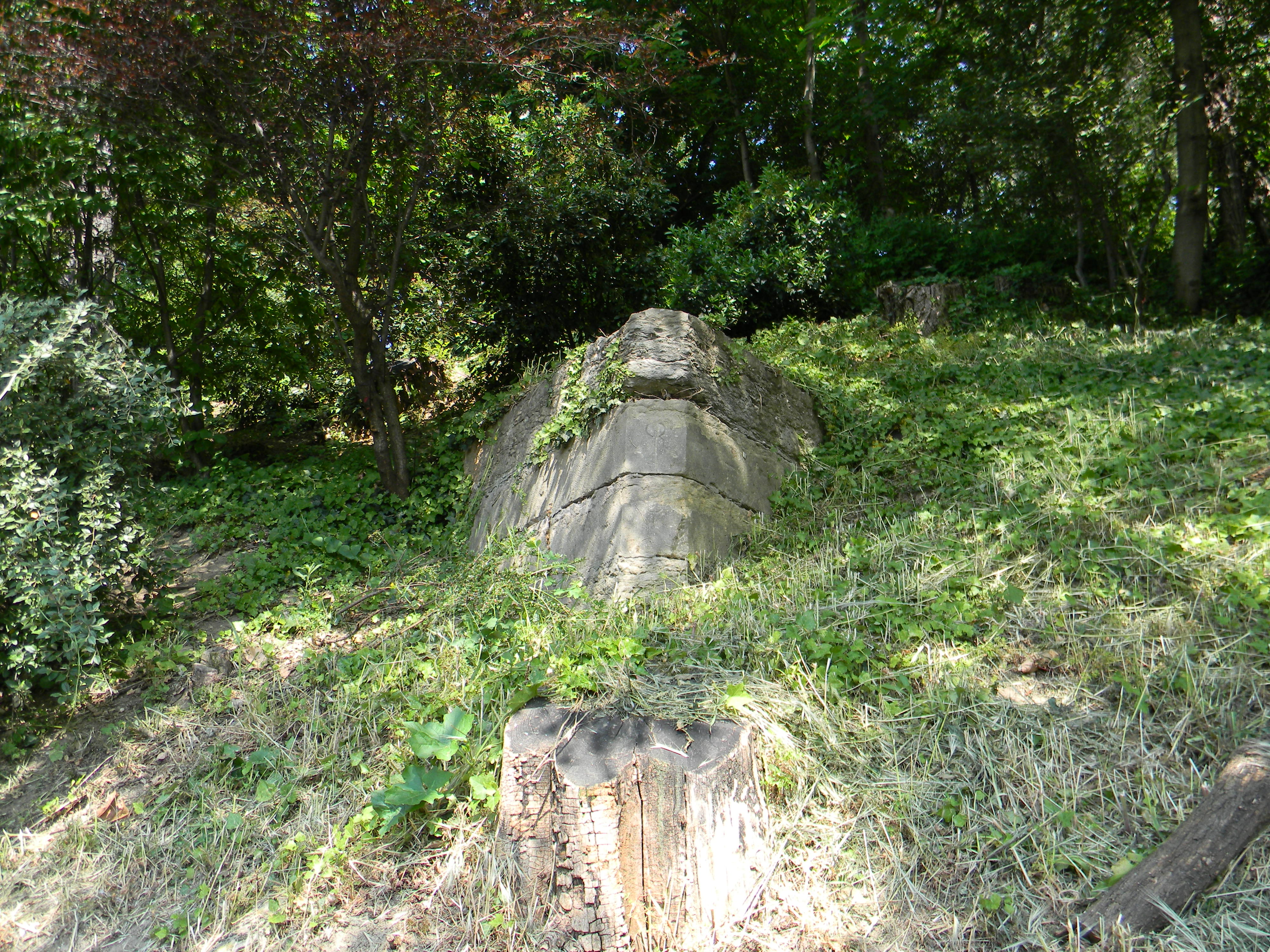
Fort ruins

== See also ==
- Ceintures de Lyon
- Fort Saint-Jean (Lyon)

== Bibliography ==
- Dallemagne, François; Georges Fessy (2006). Les défenses de Lyon: enceintes et fortifications (in French). Lyon: Éditions Lyonnaises d'Art et d'Histoire. pp. 124–126. ISBN 2-84147-177-2.
