= Fort Duchère =

Fort in France

Fort de la Duchère Fort de Balmont
- Lyon
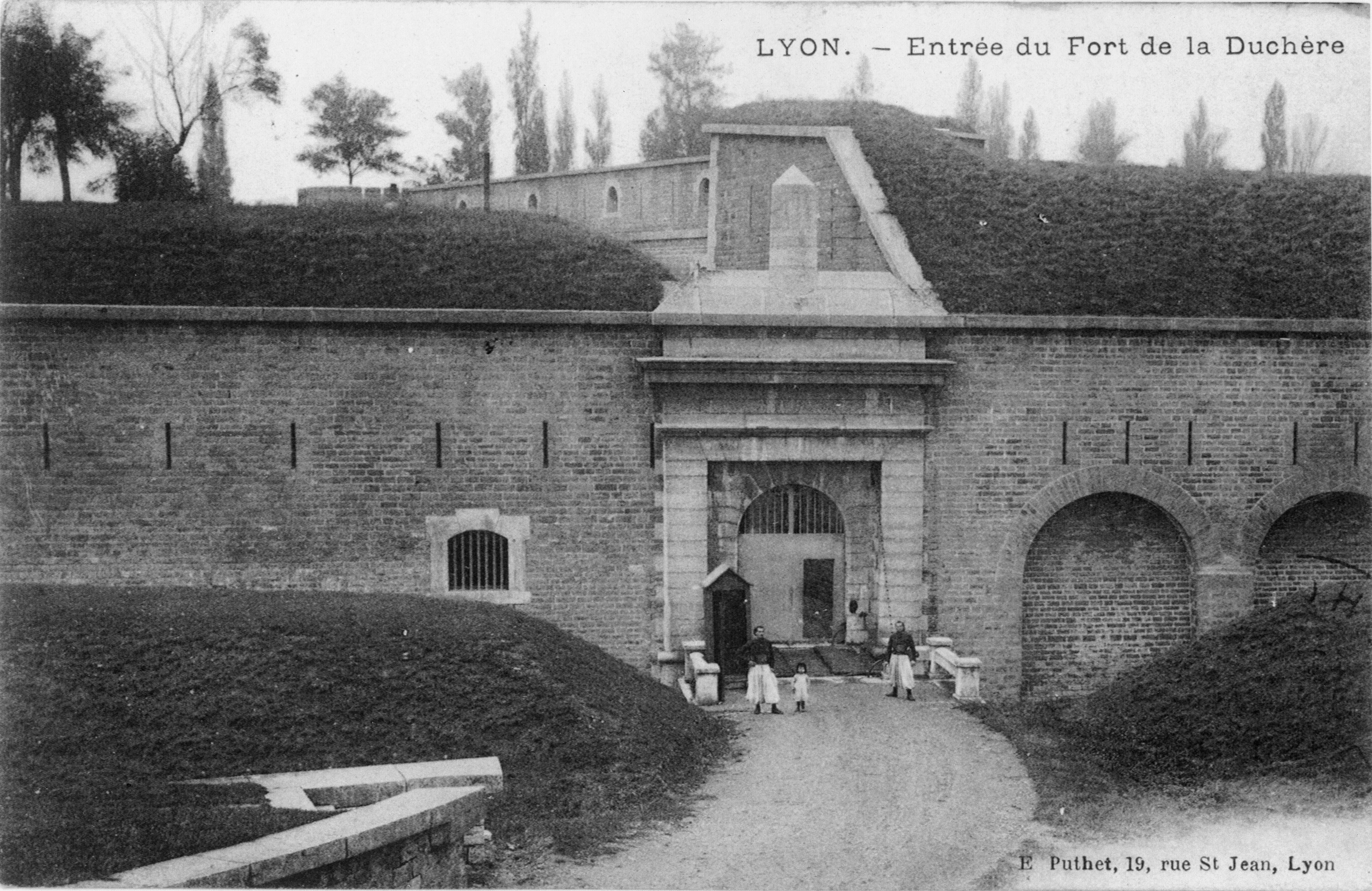
- The entrance of the fort de la Duchère.

Site information
- Type: Fort

Location
- Coordinates: 45.787°N 4.797°E

Site history
- Built: 1844
- Fate: demolished 1960

The Fort Duchère (French: fort de la Duchère, pronounced [fɔʁ də la dyʃɛʁ]) or Fort Balmont (French: fort de Balmont, pronounced [fɔʁ də balmɔ̃]) is located in the 9th arrondissement of Lyon. Composed of five bastions built between 1844 and 1851, it is part of the first belt of fortifications in Lyon, which include:

- Fort de Caluire (now demolished),
- Fort de Loyasse and
- Fort Saint-Jean.

This fort was unusual for its star shape, evoking the style of Vauban fortification and construction. It was demolished in 1960 and replaced by a sports complex.

== History ==
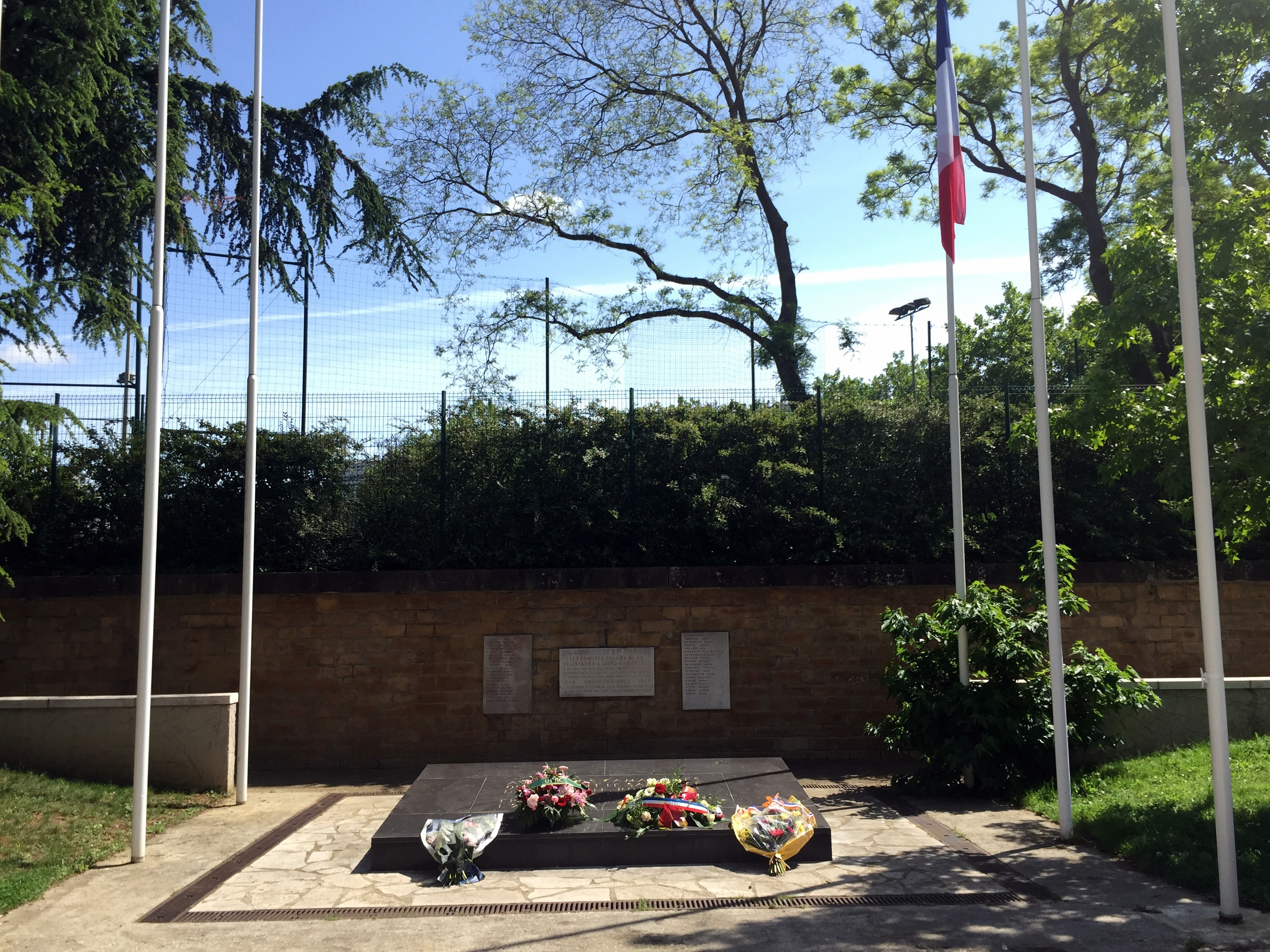
A Wall of Honor at La Duchère in honor of the 39 martyred resistance fighters.

It was originally built to defend Lyon in case the enemy managed to infiltrate Limonest by the road from Paris, more particularly by royal roads of Burgundy and Bourbonnais.

In 1944, 39 French Resistance fighters were shot by the Vichy French at the fort after they were sentenced to death at a court-martial. Decommissioned in 1957, the fort was used in the 1960s as a recruitment center for the army, then welcomed returning soldiers home from Algerian War.

== Contemporary period ==
When the neighborhood of Duchère was built, Fort Balmont became a sports complex that included Duchère Stadium and the Stephane-Diagana Athletic Hall. Nothing remains of the fort there now.

== See also ==
- Ceintures de Lyon

== Bibliography ==
- Dallemagne, François (2006). Éditions Lyonnaises d'Art et d'Histoire (ed.). Les défenses de Lyon: enceintes et fortifications. Georges Fessy(photographer). Lyon. p. 94. ISBN 2-84147-177-2.
