= Fort Saint-Jean (Lyon) =

Fort Saint-Jean Fort Maupetit
- Lyon
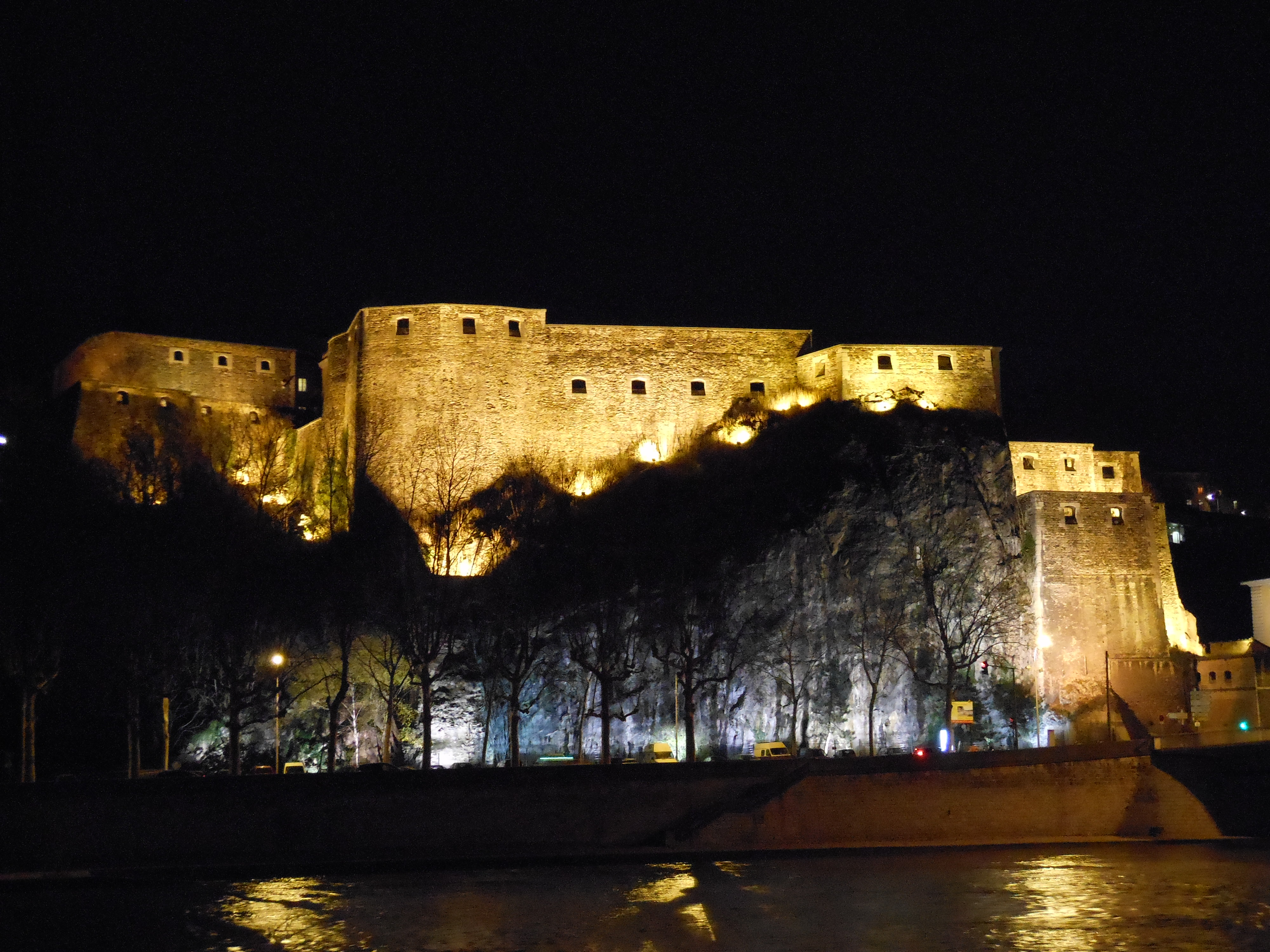
- View of fort at night from the quays of the Saône river

Site information
- Type: Fort

Location
- Coordinates: 45°46′13″N 4°48′55″E

Site history
- Built: 1834
- Part of the primary belt of forts of Lyon

The Fort Saint-Jean (French pronunciation: [fɔʁ sɛ̃ ʒɑ̃]) is located in the 1st arrondissement of Lyon and part of the first fort belt of Lyon, which includes Fort de Loyasse, and the now-demolished Fort Duchère and Fort de Caluire.

== History ==
The fort was initially nothing but a bastion built as a component of the wall around the Croix-Rousse hill at the beginning of 16th century by François I, to protect the town from the Swiss. In 1636 the Halincourt gate was built to the Rhone. The fort was completed in the 18th century, but construction of the current building began in 1834. Fort Saint-Jean has an area of 17,000 m^{2} and dominates the Saône river from 40m above the river. In 1932, the Military Health Service had its regional pharmacy there.

On 2 September 1944, when Lyon was occupied by the Germans, a group of volunteers gathered at the fort to prevent the occupiers from destroying the bridges over the Saône.

In 1984 the fort was occupied by the Veterinary Service of the Armed Forces.

== Today ==
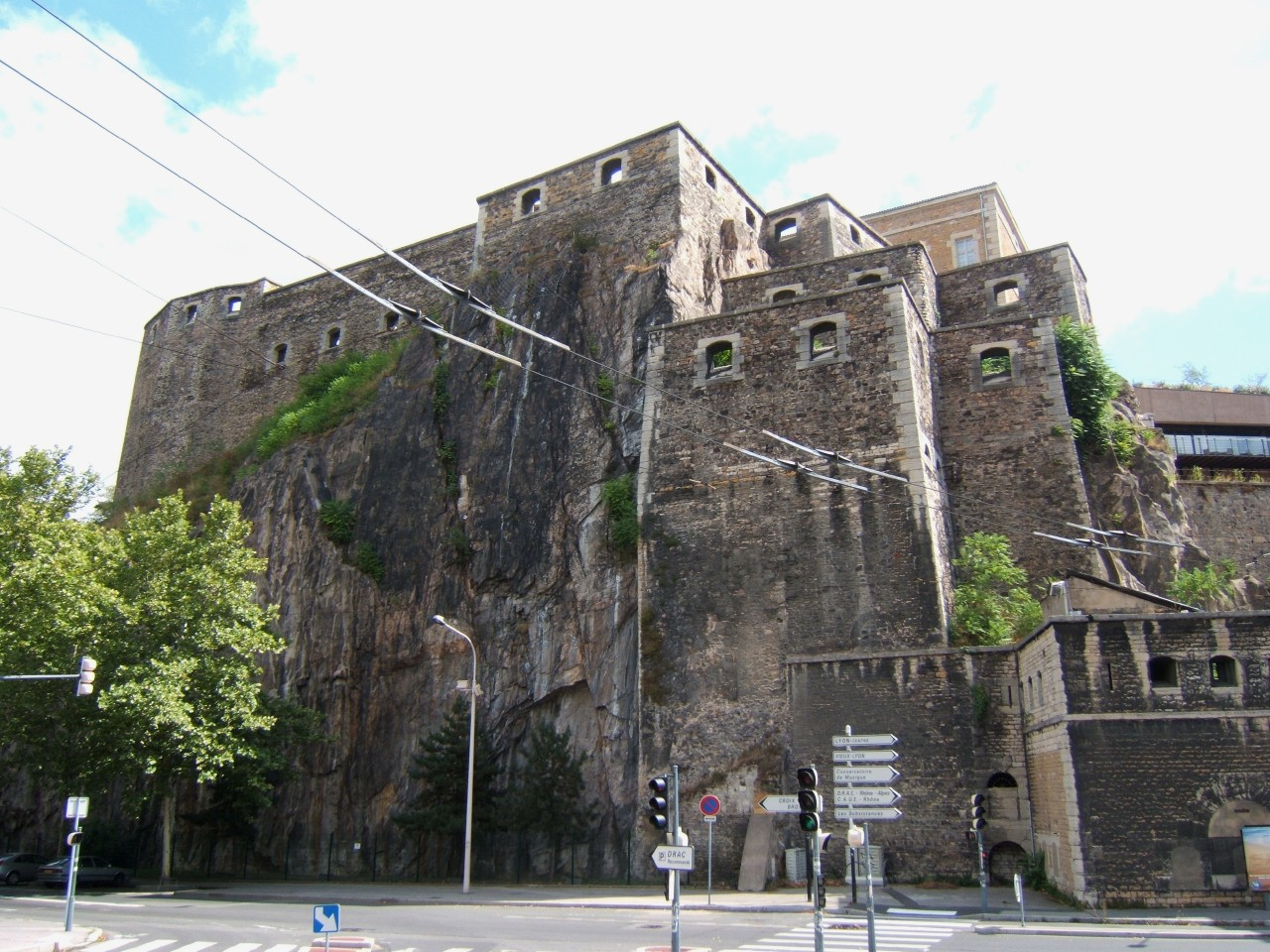
View of the fort from the quays of the Sâone

Rehabilitated in 2001 by architect Pierre Vurpas, Fort St. Saint-Jean has been home, since 2004, to the National Treasury School (ENT) which became the National School of Public Finance (ENFiP) on 4 August 2010. This school trains public finance controllers and occasionally hosts cultural events.

== See also ==
- Ceintures de Lyon

== Bibliography ==
- Les défenses de Lyon, François Dallemagne; Georges Fessy(photographer). - Éditions Lyonnaises d'Art et d'Histoire, 2006. (ISBN 2-84147-177-2)
