= Stade de Balmont =

Sports stadium in Lyon, France

Stade de la Duchère-Balmont
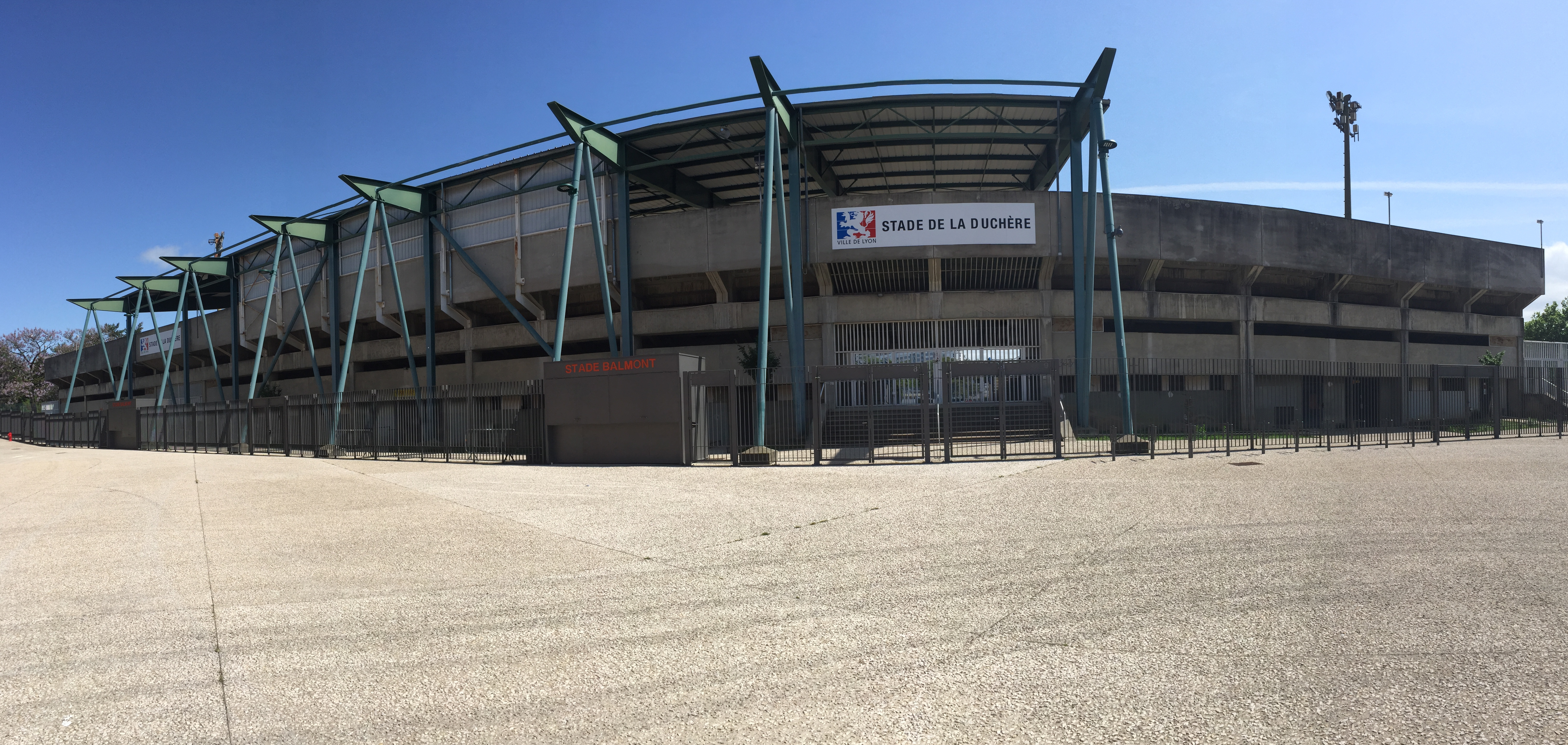

- Location within France
- Address: 270, Avenue Andreï Sakharov; 69009 Lyon
- Coordinates: 45.7879°N 4.7976°E
- Owner: City of Lyon
- Capacity: 5,438

Construction
- Built: 1966

Tenants
- Lyon La Duchère; RHC Lyon

The Stade de la Duchère-Balmont (French pronunciation: [stad də la dyʃɛʁ balmɔ̃]), formerly the Stade de la Duchère or the Stade de Balmont, is a multi-purpose stadium in Lyon, France.

Since 2000, roller skaters can benefit from a speed ring of 400 m (1,300 ft) at the ground. The stadium is the home ground of football club Lyon La Duchère and roller-skating club RHC Lyon.

Since 2012, the Stéphane-Diagana athletics hall has been located in the immediate vicinity.

== History ==
The opening of the stadium took place in 1966 on the site of the former Fort Duchère. In 2013, the athletics track was upgraded; the new track, upgraded at a cost of 1.75 million euros, was inaugurated in presence of the discus thrower Mélina Robert-Michon.

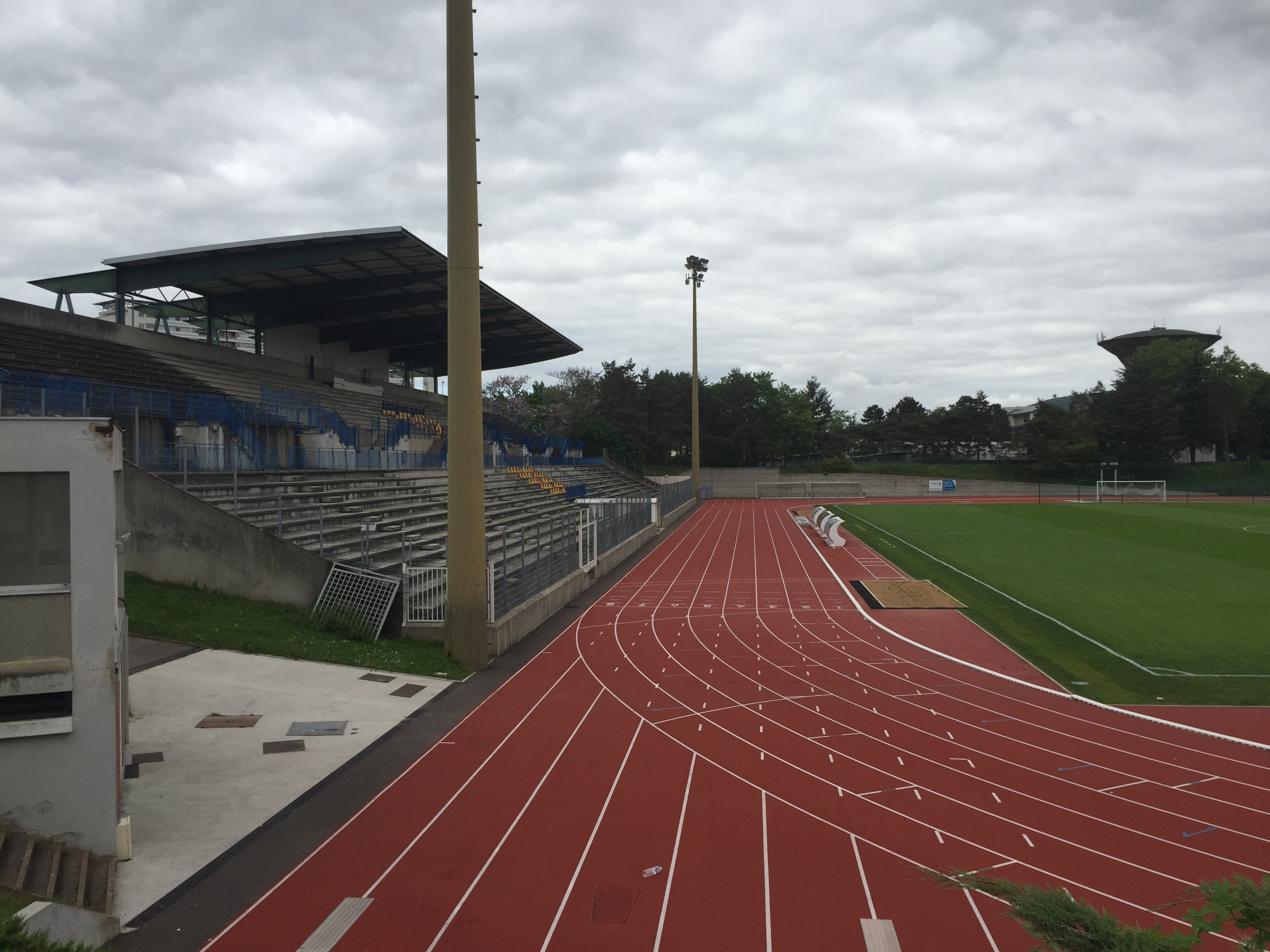
The main stand, the track and the football field
