= Saint-Rémi =

Saint-Rémi may refer to:

- Saint Rémi or Remigius (c. 437–533), Bishop of Reims
- Basilica of Saint-Remi, a medieval abbey church in Reims, France
- Musée Saint-Remi, a former abbey in Reims, France
- French ship Saint-Rémi, a 400-ton ship active in 1785
- Saint-Rémi, Quebec, a city in Les Jardins-de-Napierville
- Saint-Rémi-de-Tingwick, Quebec, a municipality in Centre-du-Québec
