= Coronation Coach of Charles X =

1825 golden coach

- Carrosse du sacre de Charles X (French)
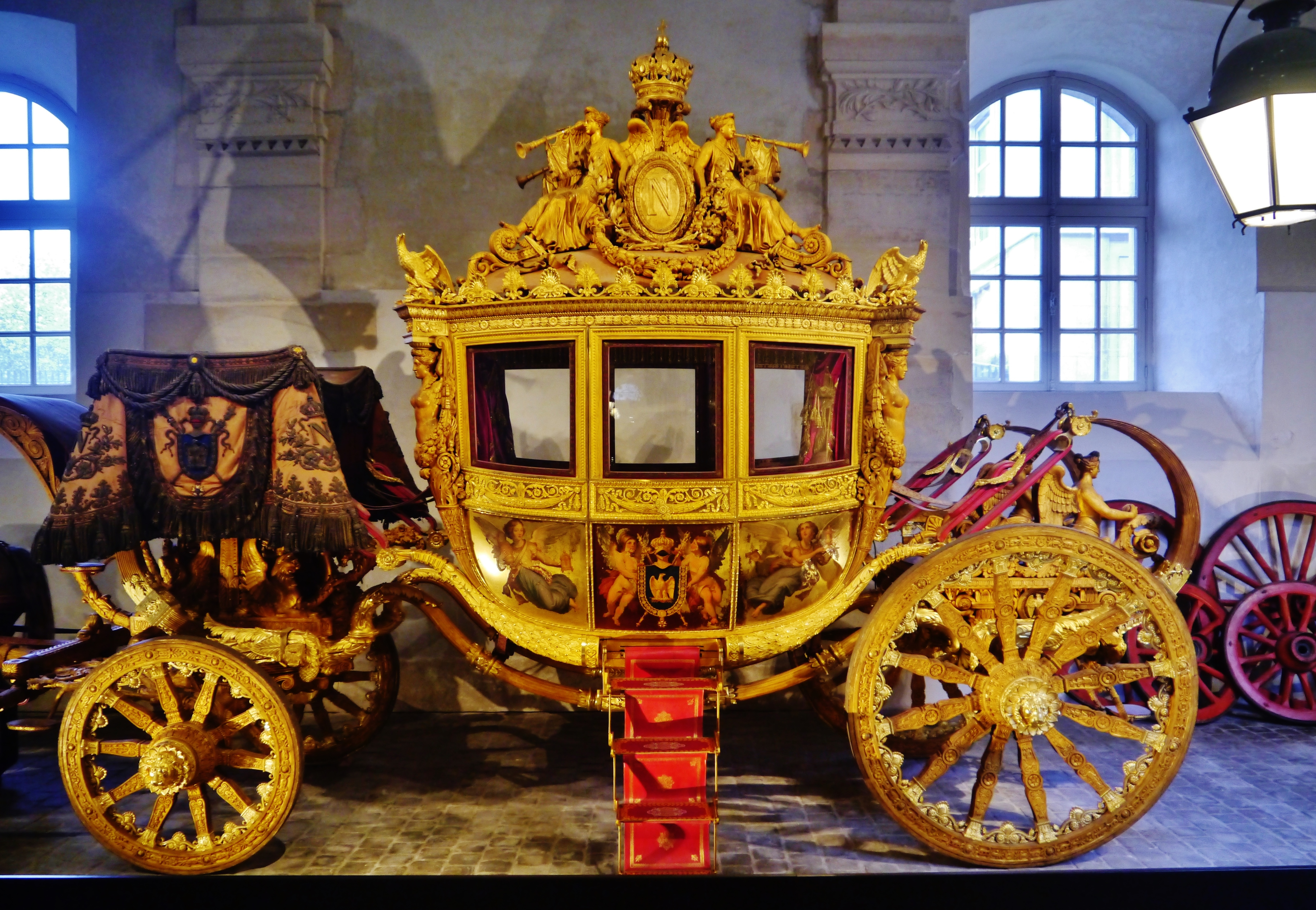
- Artist: Charles Percier (architect); Etienne-Frédéric Daldringen (coachbuilder); Henri-Victor Roguier (sculptor); Jean-François Denière (bronze worker); Pierre Claude François Delorme (painter); Jean Delalande (embroiderer); François-Joseph Gobert (passementerie maker)
- Completion date: 1825
- Type: Berlin-style coach decorated with gilded bronze figures
- Dimensions: 4.5 m × 6.7 m (15 ft × 22 ft)
- Weight: 4–5 tonnes
- Location: Galerie des Carrosses, Versailles, France

The Coronation Coach of Charles X is a horse-drawn coach used for the coronation of Charles X of France in 1825. The highly-adorned bronze- and gilt-covered state coach is the only coronation carriage of a king of France that still exists today, and is exhibited in the Gallery of Coaches in Versailles, France.

== Description ==
The coach is a Berlin style. Standing 4.5 metres high and almost 6.7 metres long, the coach weighs between 4 and 5 tonnes with its bronze sculptures, compared to a typical wood-construction state coach at 1.5 tonnes. The interior is trimmed with crimson silk velvet, decorated with gold embroidery and passementerie. It has eight windows, is supported by leather thoroughbraces (suspension straps), and it is entirely covered in bronze sculptures on the outside which have been gilded. The decoration and all the sculptures are made by Roguier.

When Napoleon III chose it for the baptism of his son, the panels were replaced to display emblems of the Second French Empire. The original panels with the royal coat of arms are stored in the Palace of Tau in Reims.

The coach is pulled at a horse's slow walk, about 3 km/h.

Details of artwork

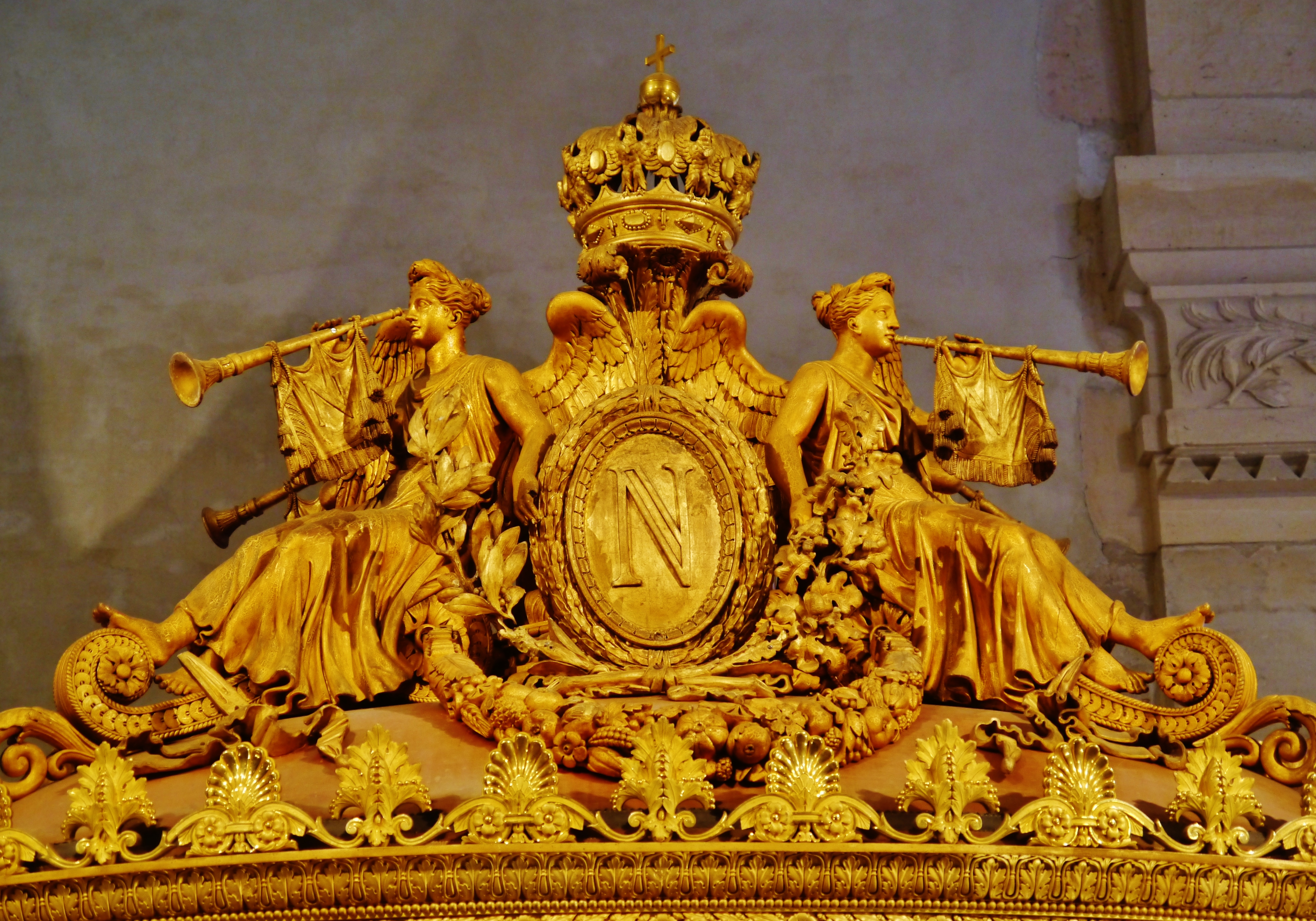
Napoleonic "N" on the roof crownpiece

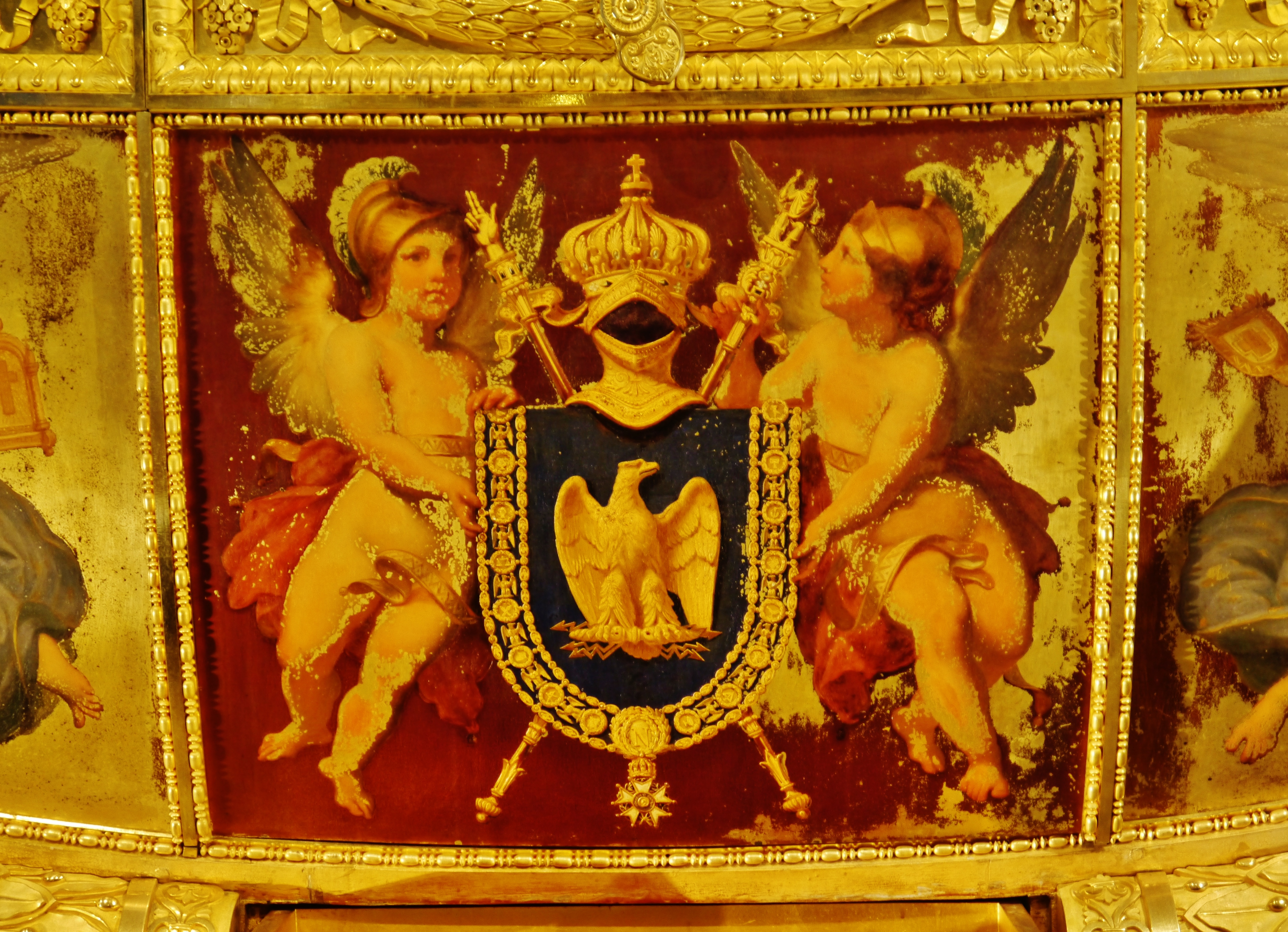
Imperial coat of arms on door panel

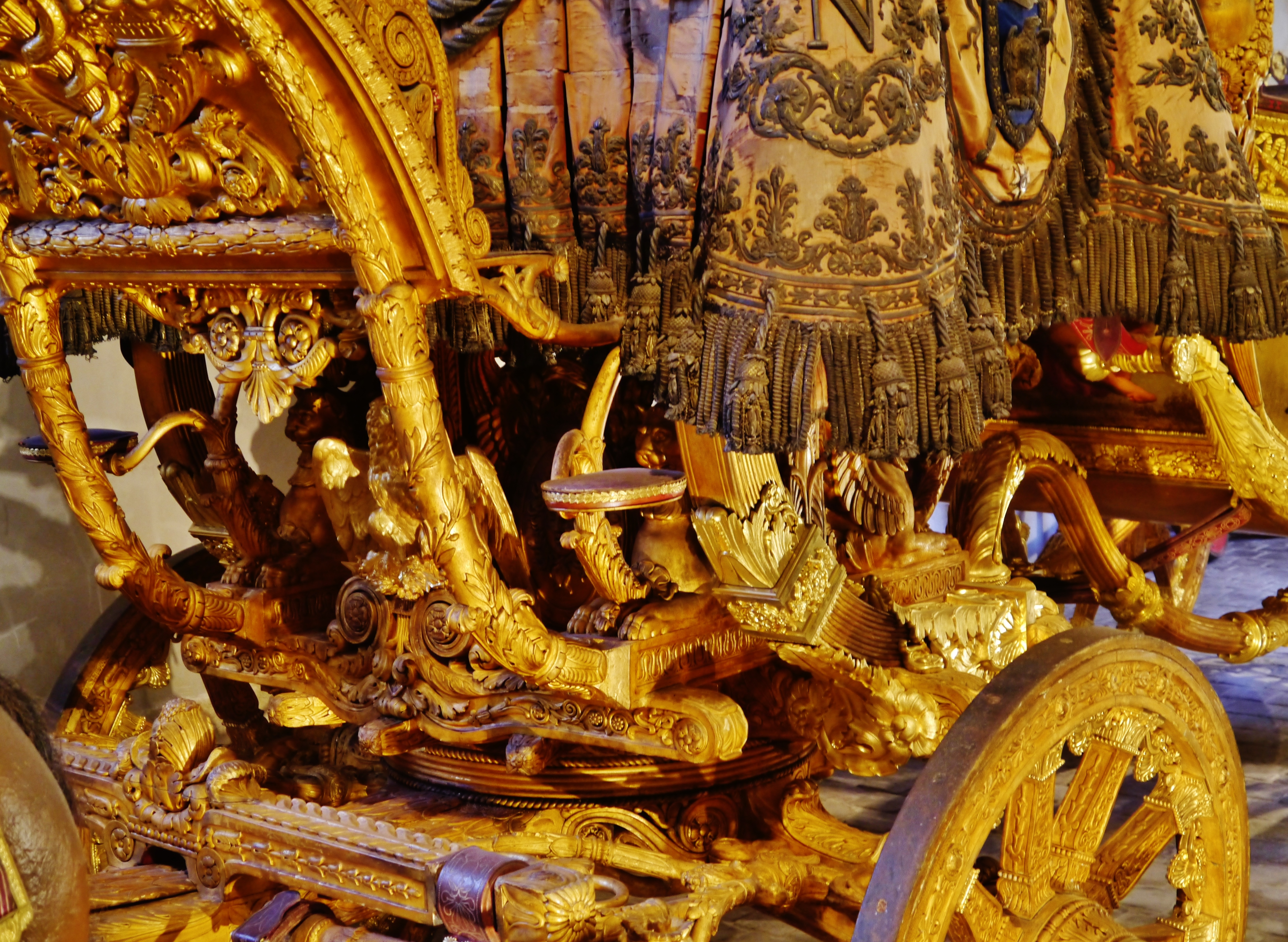
Closeup of the sculptures on the front axle assembly

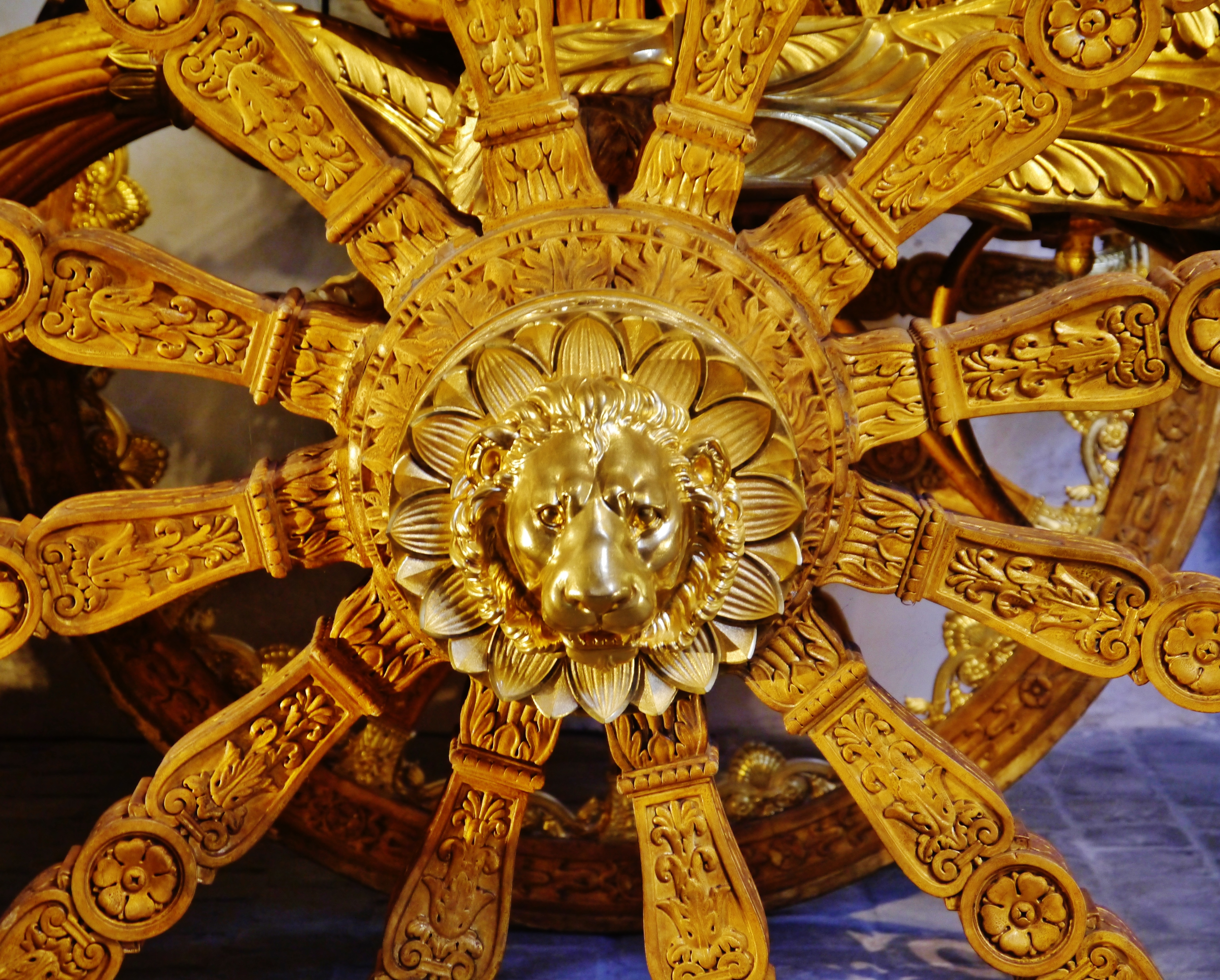
Lions heads on the wheel hubs

== History ==
Construction started in 1814 by the coachbuilder Duchesne according to the plans of the architect Charles Percier for the coronation of Louis XVIII. According to the German historian Rudolf Wackernagel, three proposed plans were submitted to the monarch: one by J.B. Pérez, the other by Antoine Carassi, and the third by Percier. Only the structures and body were finished. The construction was abandoned when the king, as a prudent politician, renounced this ritual ceremony, in the post-revolutionary and post-imperial France.

On the death of Louis XVIII in 1824, his brother Charles X acceded to the throne and announced his desire to have a coronation, thus renewing the tradition of his ancestors. The Marquis de Vernon, Grand Equerry of the king's stables, put the carriage back into construction. At a cost of 325,000 francs (equivalent to €1.02 million in 2025), the coach was completed in less than six months, engaging numerous craftsmen including coachbuilders Daldringen and Ots, sculptor Henri-Victor Roguier, bronze workers Denière and Matelin, and the painter Pierre Claude François Delorme.

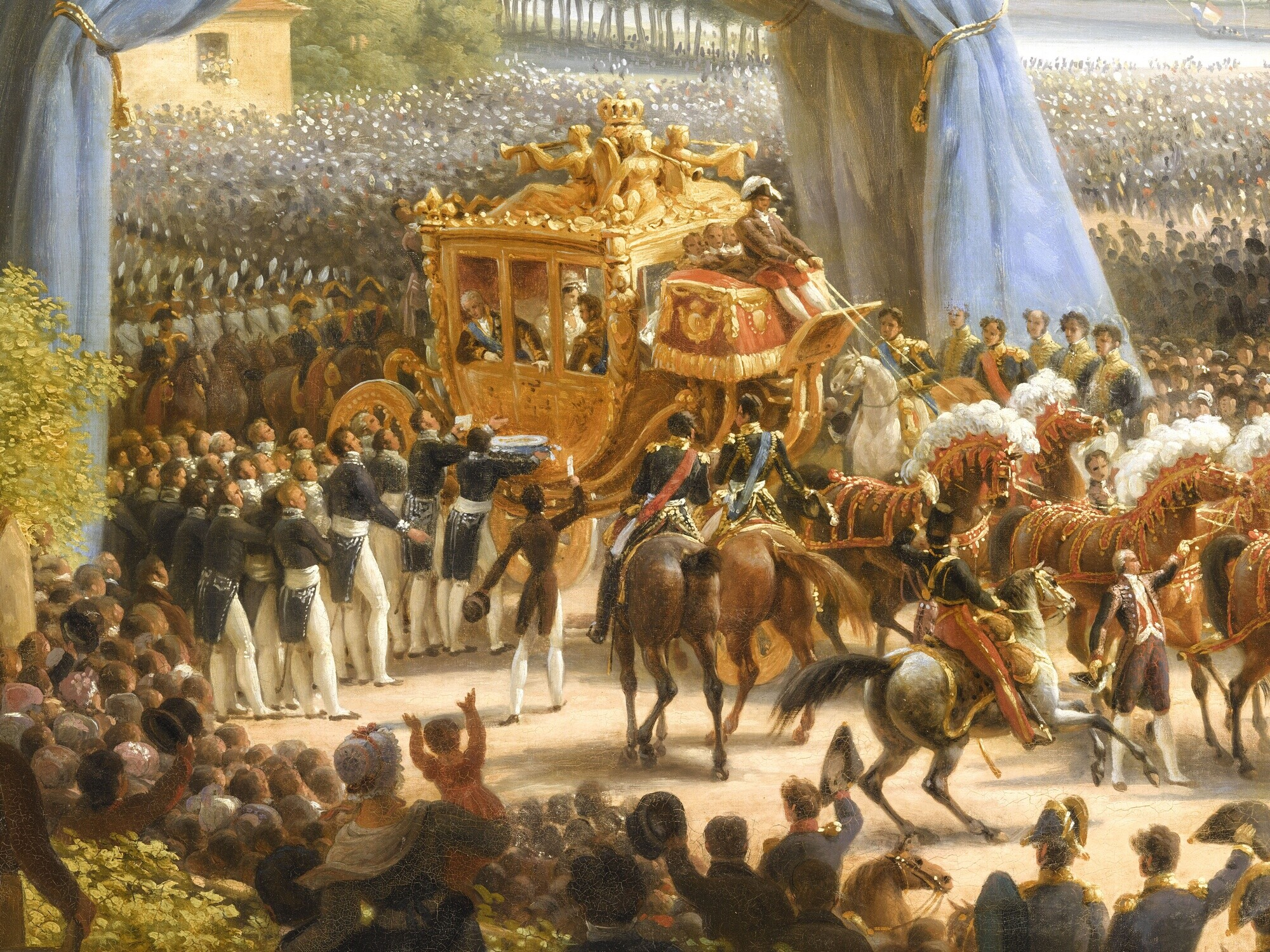
Painting: Entry of Charles X into Paris After His Coronation

For transport to Reims, the location for the coronation, the coach was partially dismantled, wrapped in a canvas cover, and fitted with sturdy wheels for the journey. It was reassembled for the sovereign's procession on May 28, 1825. Pulled by eight caparisoned horses, it was used again the following day for the procession going to the Reims Cathedral for the coronation, and again on June 6, 1825 for the arrival of Charles X into Paris.

It was used for the last time in 1856 for the baptism of Louis-Napoléon, Prince Imperial, son of Emperor Napoleon III.

Considered one of the most beautiful carriages in the world, it is the only coronation carriage of a King of France preserved today. Exhibited in the Great Stables at Versailles, it constitutes the centerpiece of the Gallery of Coaches alongside the funeral carriage of Louis XVIII.

== See also ==
- List of state coaches
- Galerie des Carrosses – Transport museum in Versailles, France
- Coronation of Charles X of France
- Coronation of the French monarch
