= Holy Ampulla =

Glass vial containing the chrism for French coronations from 1131 to 1774

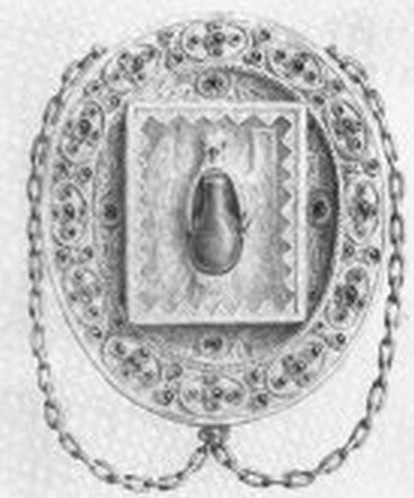
The original Holy Ampulla in its relic receptacle

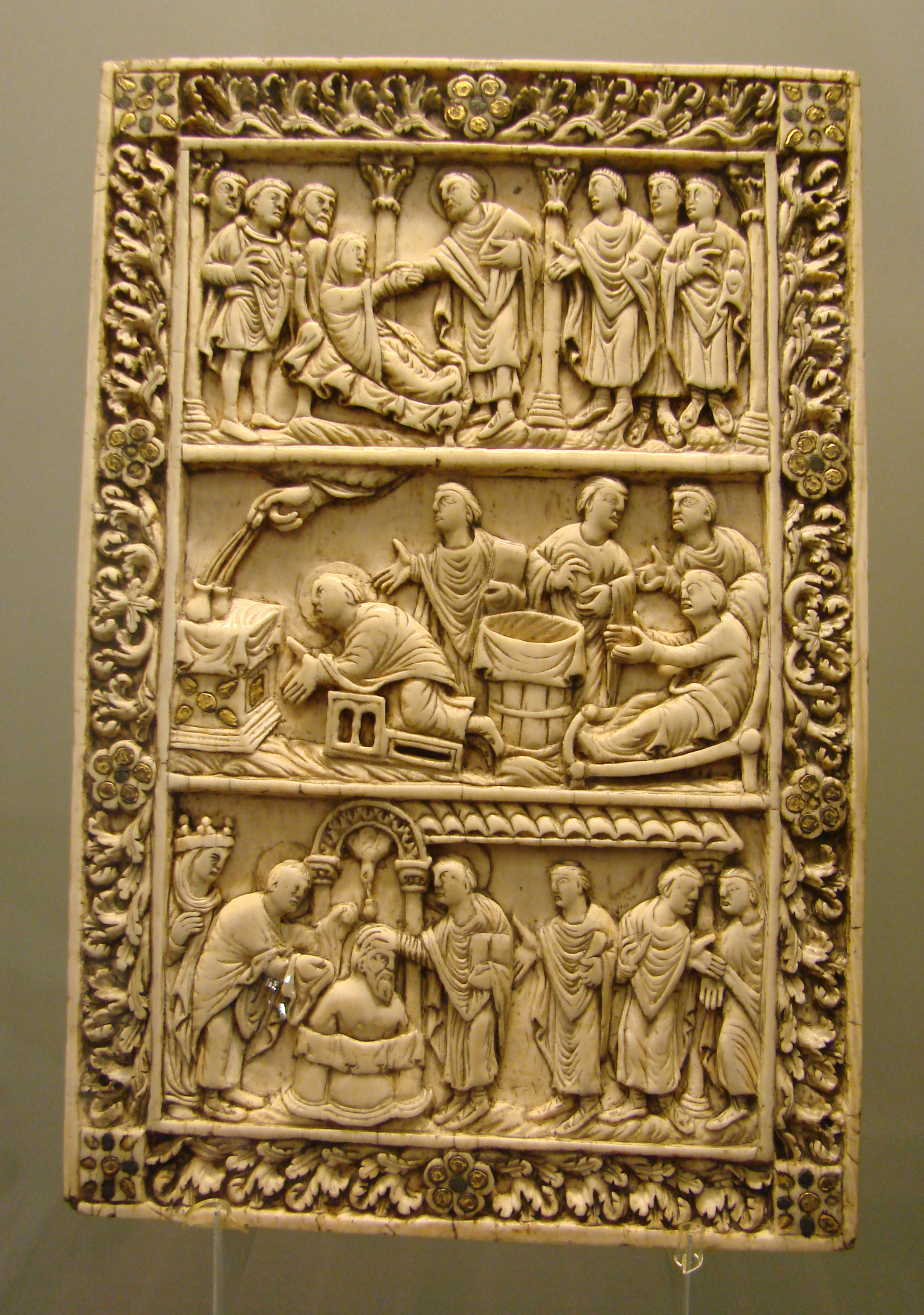
Late Carolingian ivory relief, c. 870, showing both the two different legends of the origins of the Sainte Ampoule. In the middle two vials are filled by the Hand of God, as the "moribund pagan" waits to the right. At bottom the dove of the Holy Spirit delivers the filled ampoule for the baptism of Clovis I.

The Holy Ampulla or Holy Ampoule (Sainte Ampoule in French) was a glass vial which, from its first recorded use by Pope Innocent II for the anointing of Louis VII in 1131 to the coronation of Louis XVI in 1775, held the chrism or anointing oil for the coronation of the kings of France.

== History ==
The role played by the Sainte Ampoule in the sacre of the kings of France is specified in a document of ca 1260, recently republished and examined in detail.

=== Legend of the Baptism of the Moribund Pagan ===
There was an early legend associated with St Remigius known as the Legend of the Baptism of the Moribund Pagan, according to which a dying pagan asked for baptism at the hands of St Remigius (Remi), but when it was found that there was no Oil of the Catechumens or sacred Chrism available for the proper administration of the baptismal ceremony, St Remigius ordered two empty vials be placed on an altar and as he prayed before them these two vials miraculously filled respectively with the necessary Oil of the Catechumens and Chrism. Apparently when the sepulcher containing the body of St. Remi was opened in the reign of Charles the Bald and while Hincmar was the Archbishop of Reims, two small vials were found, the contents of which gave off an aromatic scent the likes of which was like nothing known to those present. When St Remigius died the ancient art of perfumery was still known and practiced in the collapsing Roman Empire, but was unknown in the Carolingian empire four hundred years later. These vials may have originally simply been bottles of unguents used to cover the scent of decay of St Remigius's corpse during his funeral, but the memory of the two vials miraculously filled in the story of the Baptism of the Moribund Pagan and the unusual, seemingly otherworldly scents issuing from these two vials found buried with St Remigius combined to suggest to those present that these two vials were the miraculously filled vials of the legend. It was not uncommon for chalices, patens and other sacred vessels to be buried with high ranking clergymen.

=== Legend of the Holy Ampulla ===
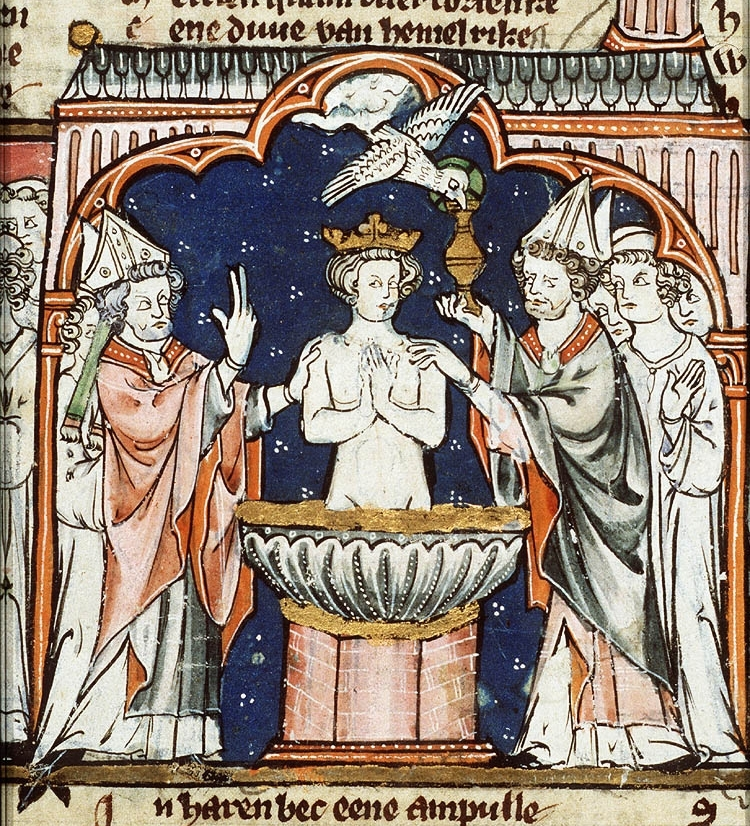
The dove of the Holy Spirit brings the Ampoule to Saint Remigius, in a manuscript of Jacob van Maerlant, Spieghel Historiael, West Flanders, ca 1335-55

Hincmar adroitly combined the discovery of these two vials with their unique, unearthly fragrance, the Legend of the Baptism of the Moribund Pagan and the historical memory that St Remigius had baptized Clovis into a new legend identifying one of these vials as the actual vial of Chrism used at the baptism of Clovis to create the new Legend of the Holy Ampulla, (i.e., that the Chrism used by Remigius when he baptized Clovis was miraculously supplied by heaven itself) which Hincmar then used to strengthen his claim that his own archepiscopal see of Reims-—as the possessor of this heaven-sent Chrism—-should therefore be recognized as the divinely chosen site for all subsequent anointings of French kings. The fate of the second vial is uncertain. It has been suggested that since in the original form of the legend this would have been the vial containing the Oil of the Catechumens and that the French coronation ordinals prescribe the Oil of the Catechumens, rather than Chrism, for the anointing of queens, it was subsequently used for anointing the queens of France and it is possible that a vial currently identified by some of the Bourbon Legitimists as the Holy Ampulla is actually this second vial.

The ampoule, a vial of Roman glass about 1½ inches tall, came to light at Reims in time for the coronation of Louis VII in 1131. The legend that was associated with it at that time, asserted that it had been discovered in the sarcophagus of Saint Remi and identified it with the baptism of Clovis I, the first Frankish king converted to Christianity; it was kept thereafter in the Abbey of Saint-Remi, Reims and brought with formality to the Cathedral of Notre-Dame, Reims at each coronation, where the emphasis was on the anointment rather than on the crowning. As C. Meredith Jones remarked, in reviewing Sir Francis Oppenheimer's monograph of the Holy Ampulla, "It gained a reputation for holiness and authenticity that brought fame, wealth and great honours to the see of Reims."

An order of knights named after the ampoule, the Knights (later Barons) of the Holy Ampulla was created for the coronation of kings. The Bishop of Laon held the right to carry the Holy Ampoule during the coronation ceremony. Only three of the kings who ruled between Louis the Pious and Charles X were not anointed with holy oil at Reims Cathedral.

The ampoule was destroyed in 1793 by French revolutionaries, when the Convention sent Philippe Rühl to smash the ampoule publicly on the pedestal of the statue of Louis XV with a hammer. The day before its destruction the constitutional curé, Jules-Armand Seraine and a municipal officer, Philippe Hourelle had nevertheless largely emptied the ampulla of its balm and they as well gave some part of it respectively to Bouré, curé of Berry-au-Bac and Lecomte, judge at the tribunal of Reims.

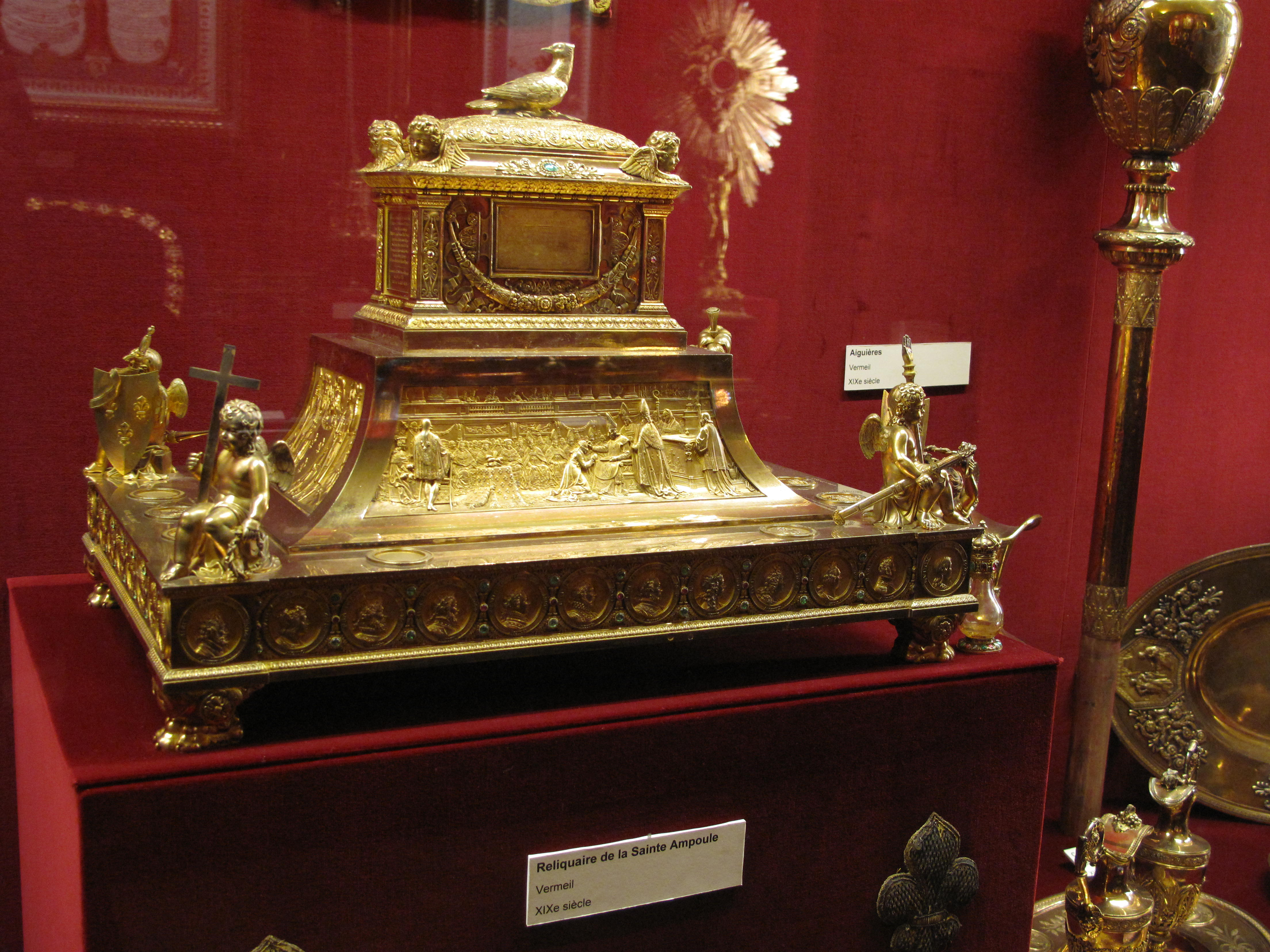
The reliquary of the ampoule.

Furthermore, Louis Champagne Prévoteau (a witness of the destruction by Rühl) ensured the preservation of two pieces of the glass vial with some remaining balm on them. All these fragments except the one kept by Hourelle which was lost were gathered on 25 May 1825 by the Archbishop of Reims. These were placed in a new reliquary made in time for the coronation of Charles X four days later which is now displayed at the Palace of Tau. Since 1906, the preserved contents of the Holy Ampulla are kept at the Archbishopric of Reims.

== Coronation of the kings of England ==
Among the implements used in the coronation of the British monarch is a golden, eagle-shaped Ampulla and spoon. The Ampulla was believed to have been first used in the coronation of Henry IV in 1399. According to legend, it was made to contain the oil presented by the Virgin Mary to St Thomas of Canterbury. Its accompanying golden spoon, which is certainly of the 13th century, is used to anoint the sovereign on several parts of the body. The current holy Ampulla was created in 1661 by goldsmith Robert Vyner for the coronation of King Charles II. The Coronation Spoon also used for the anointing ceremony is the only English royal regalia that survived the English Civil War.

== See also ==
- Monza ampullae
