= Galerie des Carrosses =

Transport museum in Versailles, France

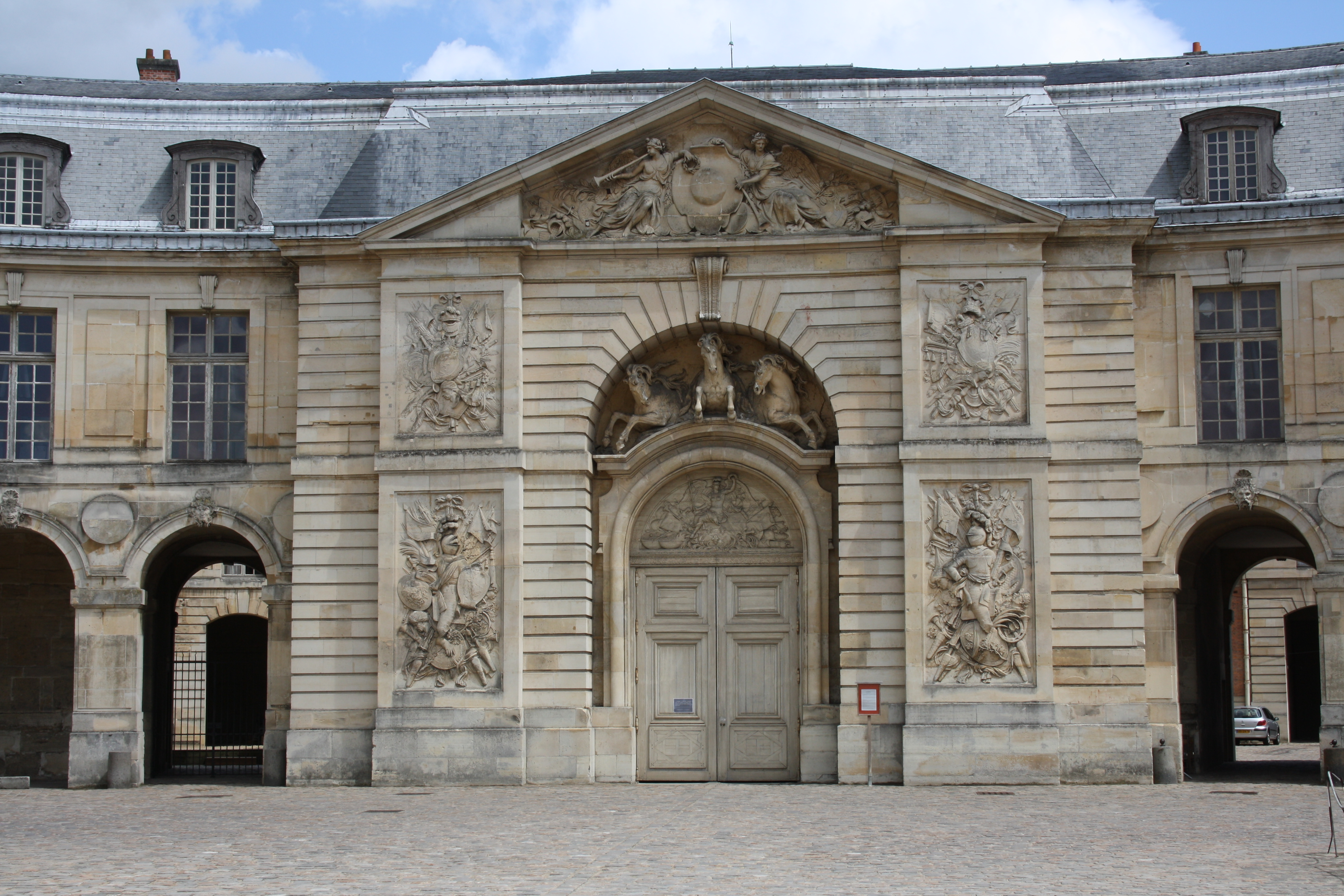
- La Grande Écurie

- Location within France
- Established: 1851
- Location: Versailles, France
- Coordinates: 48°48′14″N 2°07′42″E
- Collections: Historical Vehicles
- Website: Galerie des Carrosses

The Galerie des Carrosses (Gallery of Coaches), and previously named the Musée des Carrosses until 2006, is a history and transport museum in Versailles (Yvelines), France, featuring a collection of carriages, mainly from the 19th century. Part of the Public Establishment of the Palace, Museum and National Estate of Versailles, it is housed in the Grande Écurie (Great Stable).

== Historical background ==
After the carriages had been dispersed at the great revolutionary sales following the French Revolution, this museum was created by King Louis-Philippe I in 1833 when he decided to transform Versailles into a museum dedicated to "all the glories of France". It was installed in the purpose-built Petit Trianon building, which was designed by Charles-Auguste Questel, architect of the civil buildings at Versailles. The first Trianon carriage museum opened its doors to the public in 1851.

In 1978, the Musée des Carrosses was moved from the Trianon to one of the galleries of the Grande Écurie, a site previously occupied by various government departments - Ministry of Defense, Departmental Archives, École des Beaux-Arts - and hard-fought for by the then Versailles curator, Gérald Van der Kemp. At the same time, the dilapidated Questel building in Trianon was demolished.

After renovation, the museum was reopened to the public in 1985.

Closed since 2006, after expansion and restoration work on the carriages, thanks to the patronage of Société Michelin, it reopened to the public on May 10, 2016 as the Galerie des Carrosses.

Both a museum of French history and a museum of 18th- and 19th-century transport, the Galerie des Carrosses showcases the finest prototypes and the latest advances in French coachbuilding in terms of comfort, performance and technology: traction, suspension, first convertible coupés. In France, the first carriages appeared in Paris during the reign of Louis XIV, around 1660-1665.

== Collections ==
The collection mainly comprises nineteenth-century vehicles, with berlines and gala carriages from Napoleon I's imperial court, Louis XVIII's funeral coach, and the Coronation Coach of Charles X. The museum possesses only a few vehicles dating from the Ancien Régime, including the berline of the Dauphin Louis de France (1781-1789), litters and six sleds.

Lavishly adorned with gold and carvings, these ceremonial vehicles were designed to impress. They represent monarchy, pomp, wealth and tradition. The carriages in the gallery are the creations of the Court's finest artists and luxury craftsmen: architects, carpenters, saddler-bodyworkers, mirror-makers, locksmiths, bronze-makers, chisellers, gilders, founders, painters, plate-makers, trimmers and embroiderers.

Exhibits

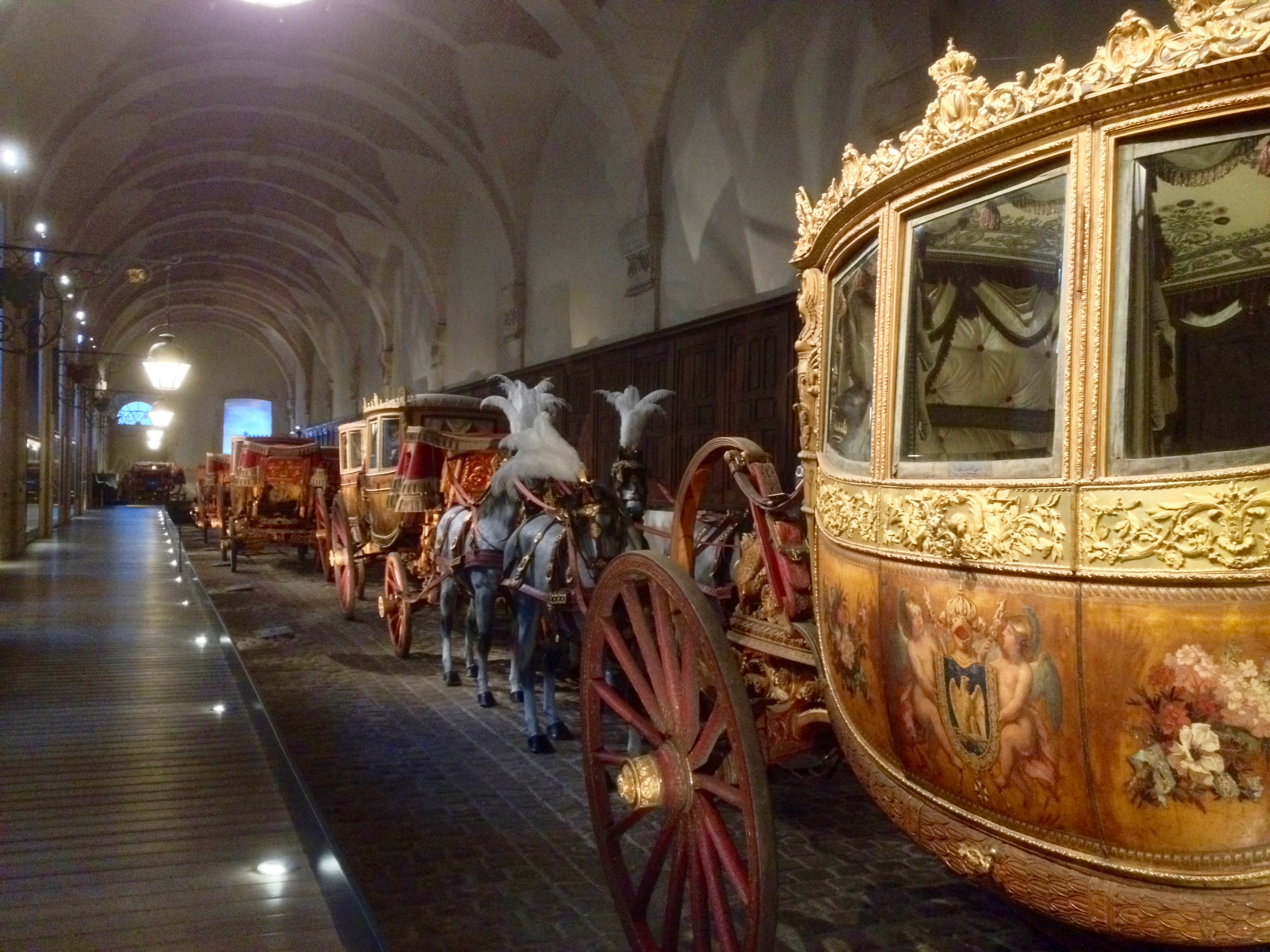
The Gallery of Coaches

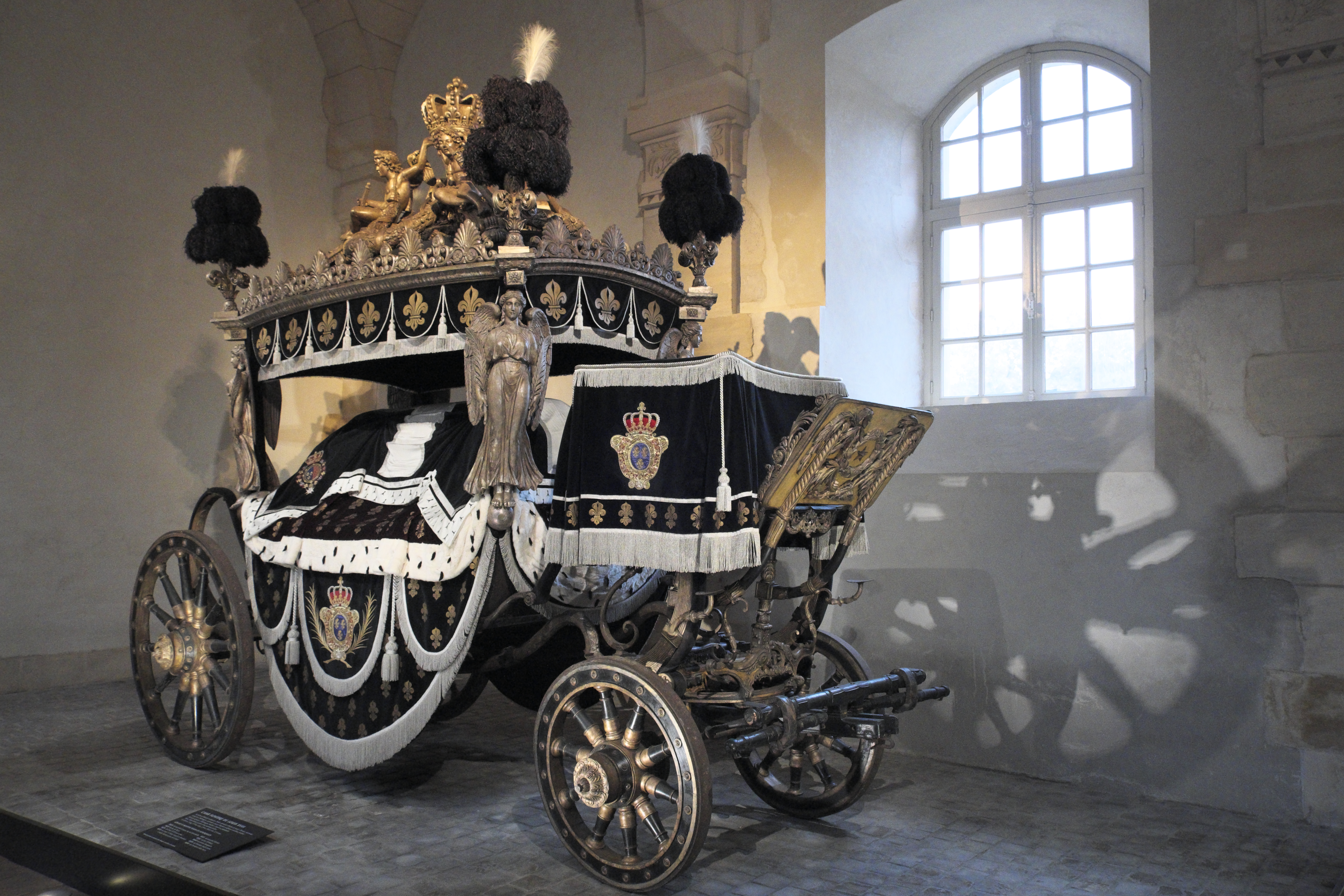
Louis XVIII's funeral coach

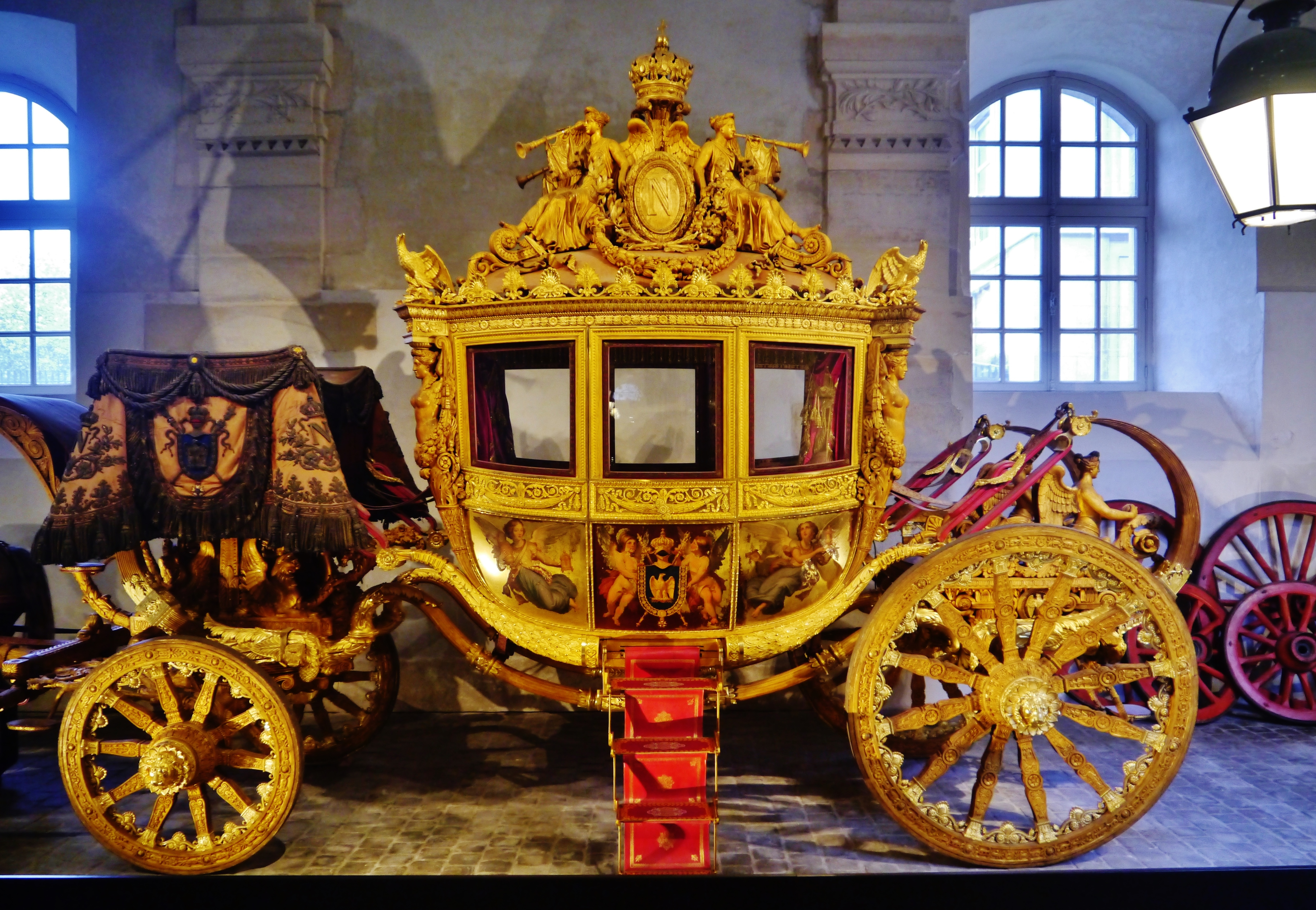
Coronation Coach of Charles X

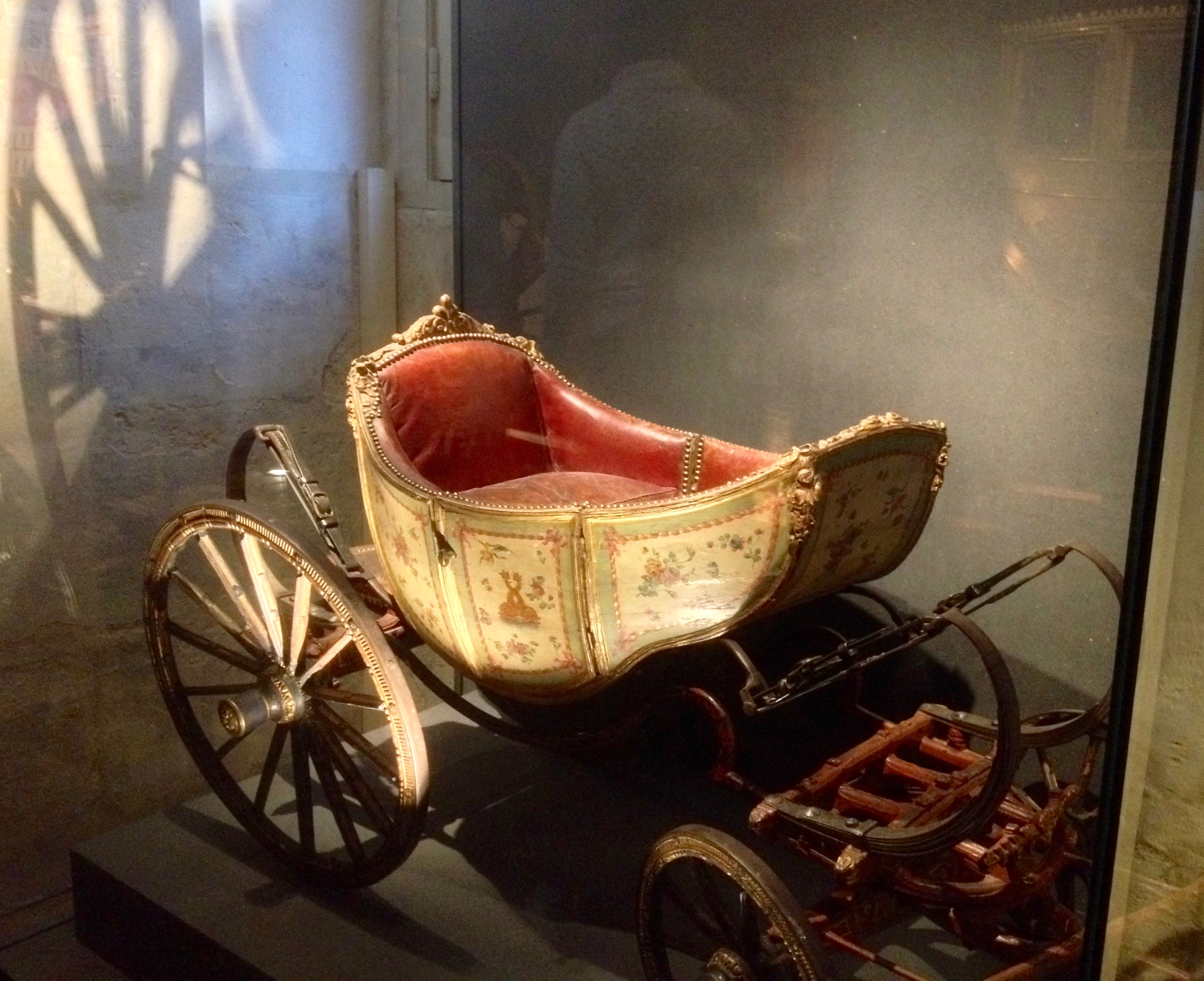
Small carriage for Louis Joseph, Dauphin of France

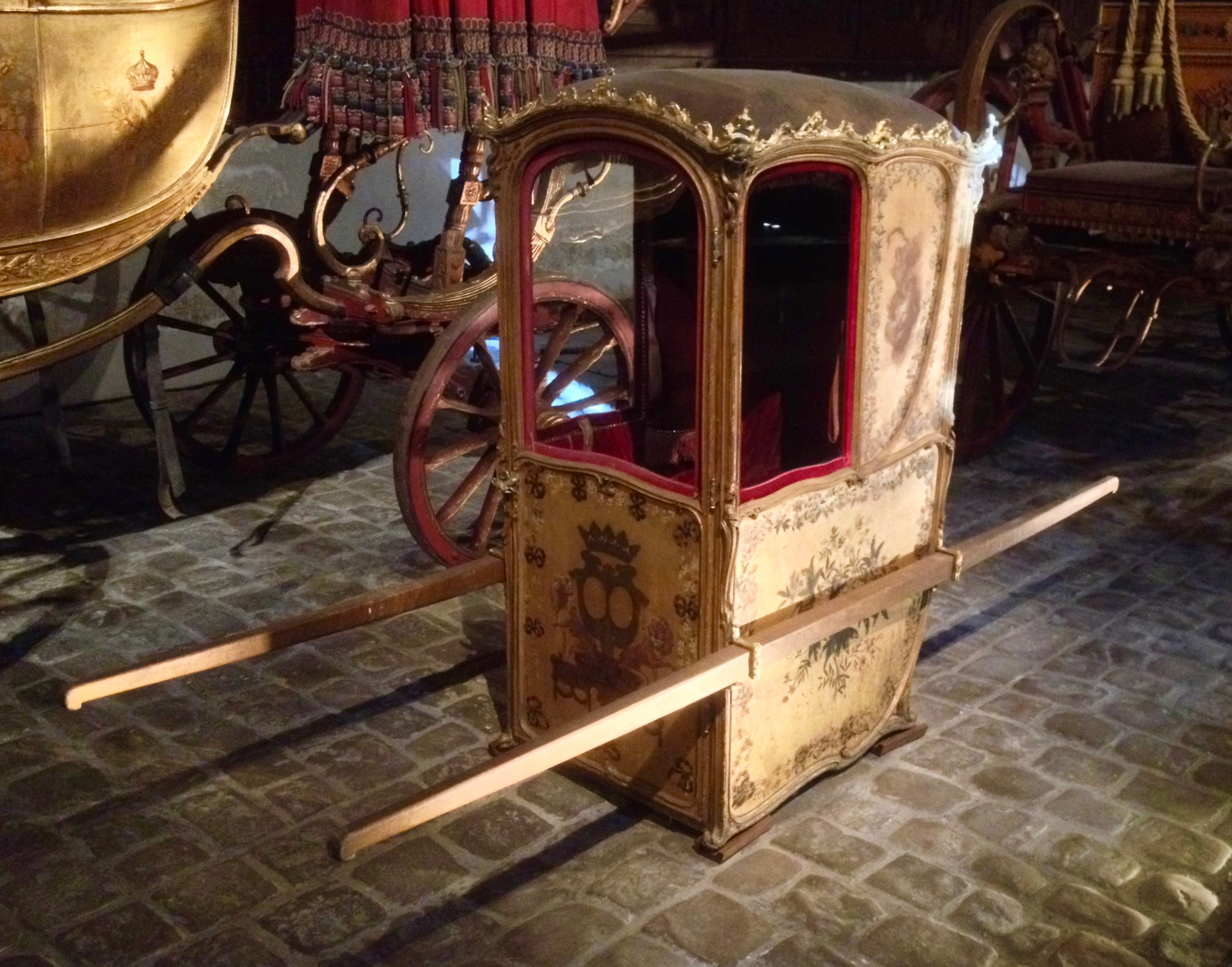
Litter (1750-1765)

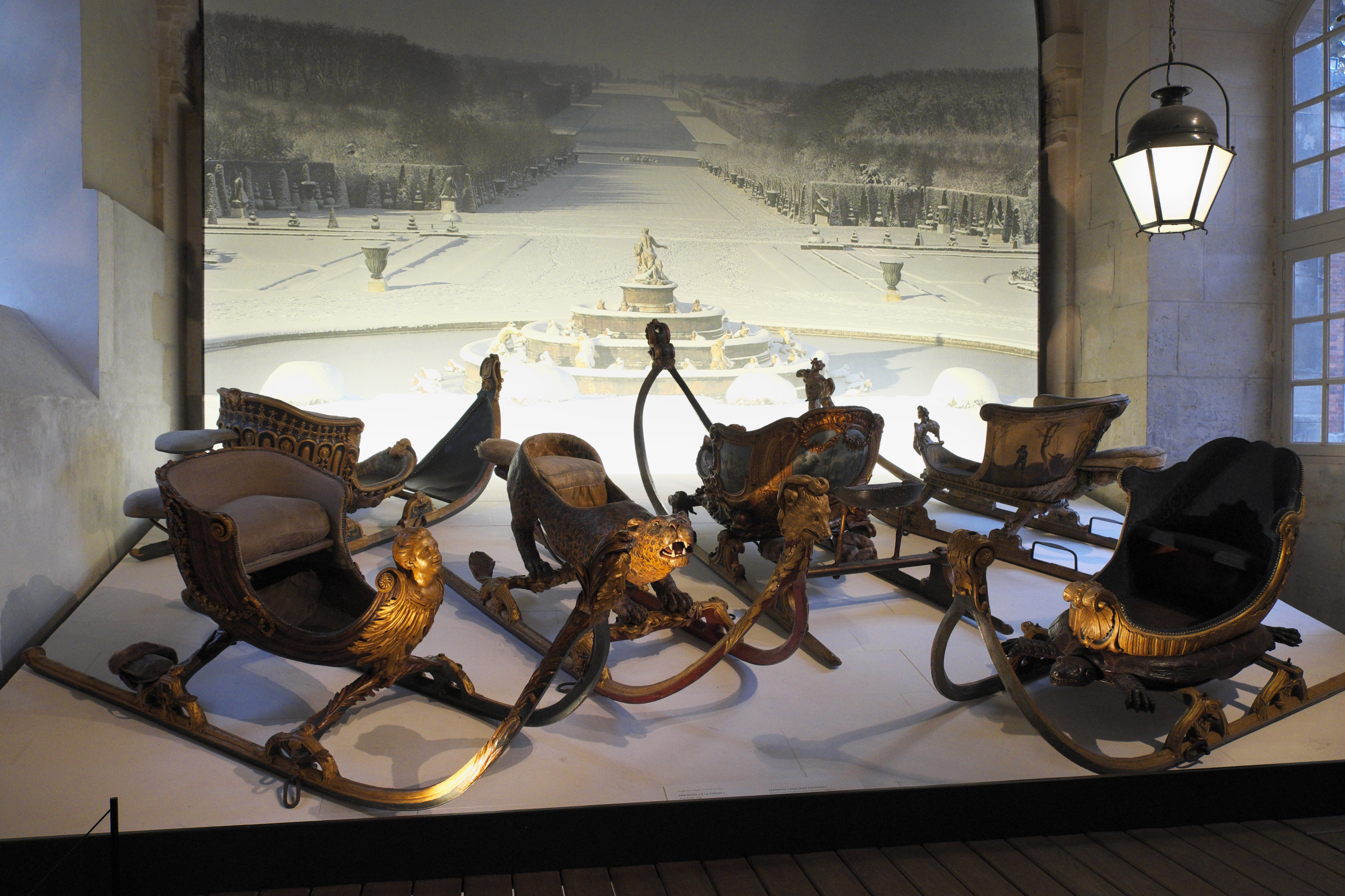
Sleds

== See also ==
- Royal Mews, Buckingham Palace
- Imperial Carriage Museum (Wagebburg) at Schönbrunn Palace, Viienna, Imperial Austria's carriage museum
