= Basilica of Saint-Remi =

- Basilique Saint-Remi
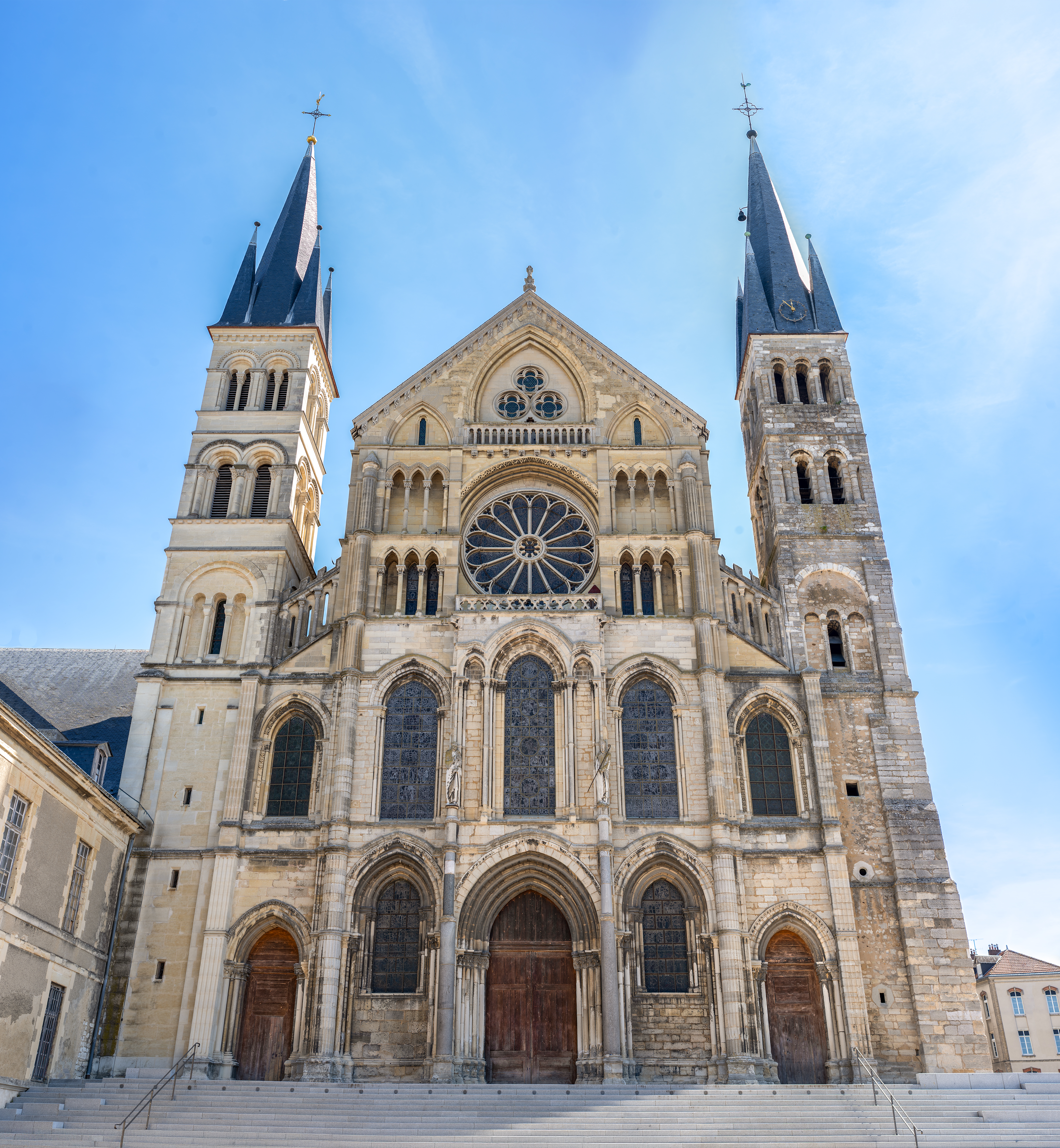
- Basilica of Saint-Remi
- 49°14′35″N 04°02′31″E
- Location: Rue Simon, Reims
- Country: France
- Denomination: Roman Catholic

Administration
- Archdiocese: Roman Catholic Archdiocese of Reims

Monument historique
- Designated: 1840
- Reference no.: PA00078785

UNESCO World Heritage Site
- Criteria: i, ii, iii
- Designated: 1991
- Part of: Cathedral of Notre-Dame, former Abbey of Saint-Remi and Palace of Tau, Reims
- Reference no.: 601-002

The Basilica of Saint-Remi (French: Basilique Saint-Remi) is a medieval abbey church in Reims, France (Rue Simon). It was founded in the 11th century "over the chapel of St. Christophe where St. Remi was buried." It is "the largest Romanesque church in northern France, though with later additions." The church has been a monument historique since 1840, and a UNESCO World Heritage Site since 1991 as a part of Cathedral of Notre-Dame, former Abbey of Saint-Remi and Palace of Tau.

== History ==
The Basilica of Saint-Remi dates from the 11th, 12th, 13th and 15th centuries. The eleventh-century nave and transepts, in the Romanesque style, are the oldest; the façade of the south transept is the most recent. Most of the construction of the church finished in the 11th century, with additions made later. The nave and transepts, Gothic in style, date mainly from the earliest, the façade of the south transept from the latest of those periods, the choir and apse chapels from the 12th and 13th centuries.

The Basilica of Saint-Remi was consecrated by Pope Leo IX in 1049.

The 17th and 19th centuries saw further additions. The building suffered greatly in World War I; the meticulous restoration work of architect Henri Deneux (1874–1969) rebuilt it from its ruins over the following 40 years. As of 2009 it remains the seat of an active Catholic parish holding regular worship services and welcoming pilgrims. It has been classified as an historical monument since 1841 and is one of the pinnacles of the history of art and of the history of France.

Several royal and archepiscopal figures lie buried in the basilica, but in unidentified graves. They include:

- Carloman King of the Franks (751–771; reigned 768–771), the brother of Charlemagne
- Queen Frederonne (died 917), wife of Charles III (879–929)
- Gerberga of Saxony (910–984), wife of Louis IV (King of Western Francia from 936 to 954)
- Henri d'Orléans (died about 1653)
- Lothair I, (941–986), King of Western Francia from 954 to 986
- Louis IV (King of Western Francia from 936 to 954)
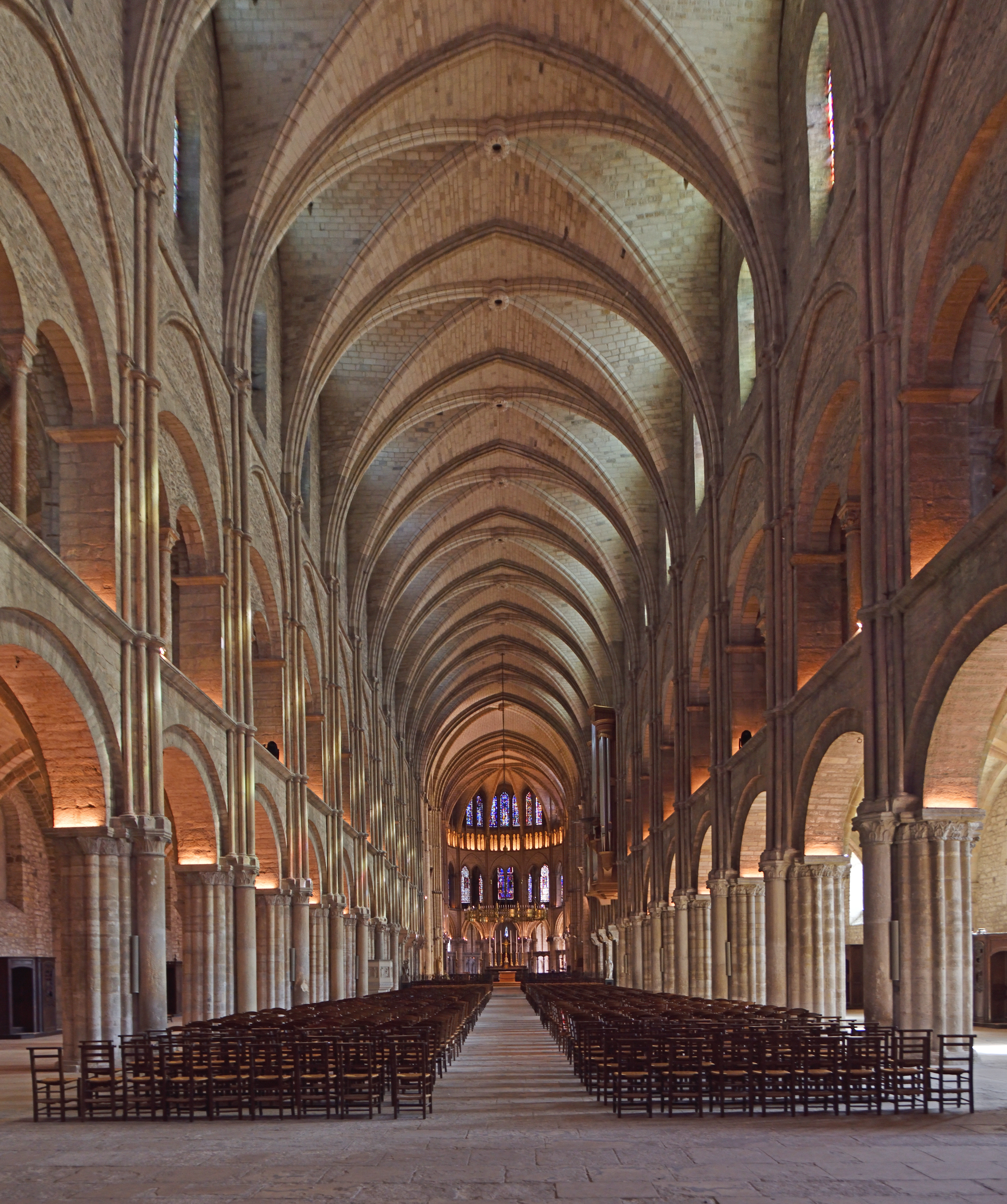
Nave
