= Musée Saint-Remi =

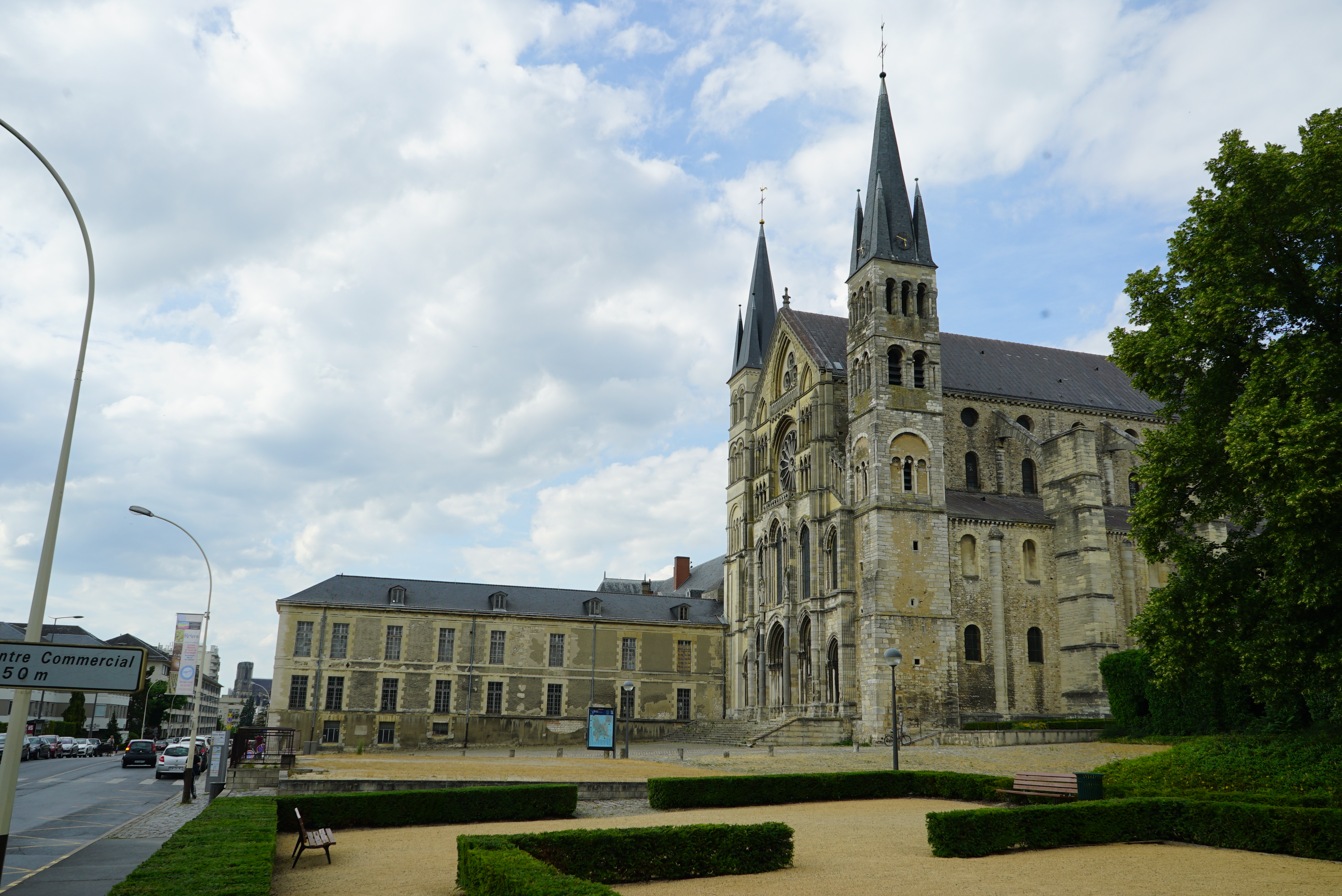
- Musée Saint-Remi (former Abbey of Saint-Remi, at the back), with the Basilica of Saint-Remi standing next to it
- Location: 53 rue Simon 51100 Reims, France
- Coordinates: 49°14′36″N 04°02′29″E
- Type: Archeology and art museum
- Website: musees-reims.fr

The Musée Saint-Remi is an archeology and art museum in Reims, France. The museum is housed in the former Abbey of Saint-Remi, founded in the sixth century and which had been keeping since 1099 the relics of Saint Remigius (the Bishop of Reims who converted Frankish king Clovis I to Christianity in 496). The Basilica of Saint-Remi, adjacent to it and consecrated in 1049, was its abbey church. Both buildings have been listed as part of a UNESCO World Heritage Site since 1991 because of their outstanding architecture and importance in the early French monarchy.

== Building ==
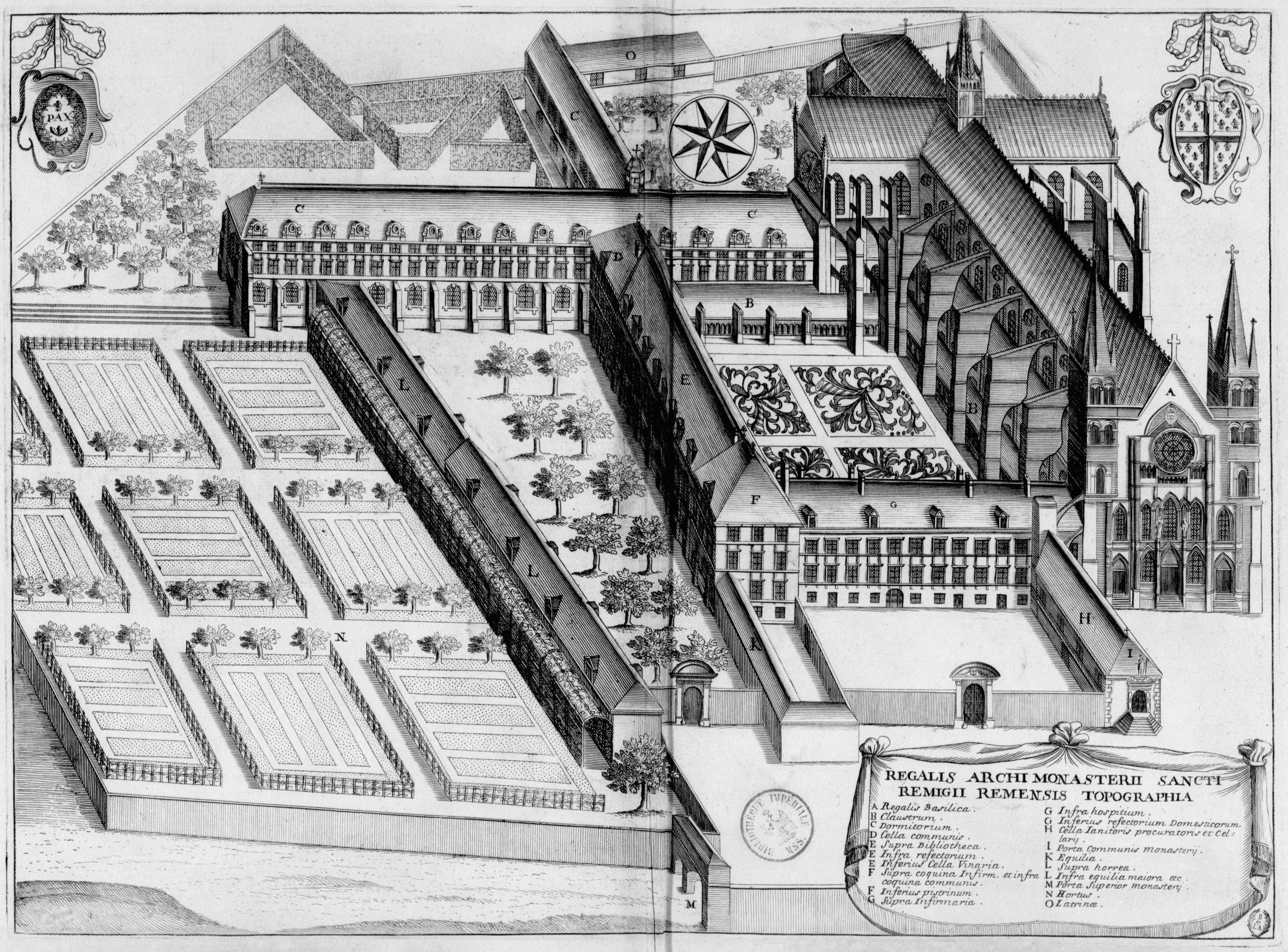

Former Abbey of Saint-Rémi
UNESCO World Heritage Site
- Interactive map of Former Abbey of Saint-Rémi
- Location: Reims, France
- Part of: Cathedral of Notre-Dame, Former Abbey of Saint-Rémi and Palace of Tau, Reims
- Criteria: Cultural: (i), (ii), (vi)
- Reference: 601-002
- Inscription: 1991 (15th Session)
- Coordinates: 49°14′35″N 4°02′31″E

The obscure origins of the great abbey at Reims lie in a little 6th-century chapel dedicated to Saint Christopher. The abbey's success was founded on its acquisition of the relics of St. Remy in 553; subsequently gifts poured in upon it from pious donors. By the 9th century the abbey possessed about 700 domains and was perhaps the most richly endowed in France. It seems probable that secular priests were the first guardians of the relics, but were succeeded by the Benedictines. From 780 to 945 the archbishops of Reims served as its abbots. At the abbey Charlemagne received Pope Leo III.

In 1005 the abbot Aviard undertook to rebuild the church of St-Remy, and for twenty years the work went on uninterruptedly before vaulting collapsed, no doubt from insufficient buttressing. Abbot Theodoric erected the magnificent surviving basilica which Pope Leo IX dedicated in 1049 and granted many privileges and he used the occasion of the visit to hold the reforming Council of Reims. The abbey library and its schools were of such high repute that Pope Alexander III wrote a commendatory letter to the Abbot Peter, which survives.

The years of around 1170 to 1180 brought further rebuilding, this time to the choir. The purpose of replacing the short eastern section of the Romanesque church was to create a grander and more spacious interior for the shrine of St Remy. The shrine was detached from its previous location, next to the altar, and moved further east.

Among the illustrious later abbots, all drawn from the higher nobility, may be mentioned: Henri de Lorraine (1622–1641), who affiliated the abbey to the Congregation of St. Maur; Jacques-Nicolas Colbert (1665), later archbishop of Rouen; Charles Maurice Le Tellier (1680–1710); and Joseph de Rochechouart, appointed abbot by the king in 1745.

Many valuable objects from the abbey were looted in the French Revolutionary period and the Holy Ampulla of the coronation of the kings of France kept in the abbey was destroyed in 1793, but the 12th-century stained glass remains.

The Abbey of Saint-Remi, together with the nearby cathedral of Notre-Dame de Reims and Palace of Tau, became a UNESCO World Heritage Site in 1991.

== Collections ==
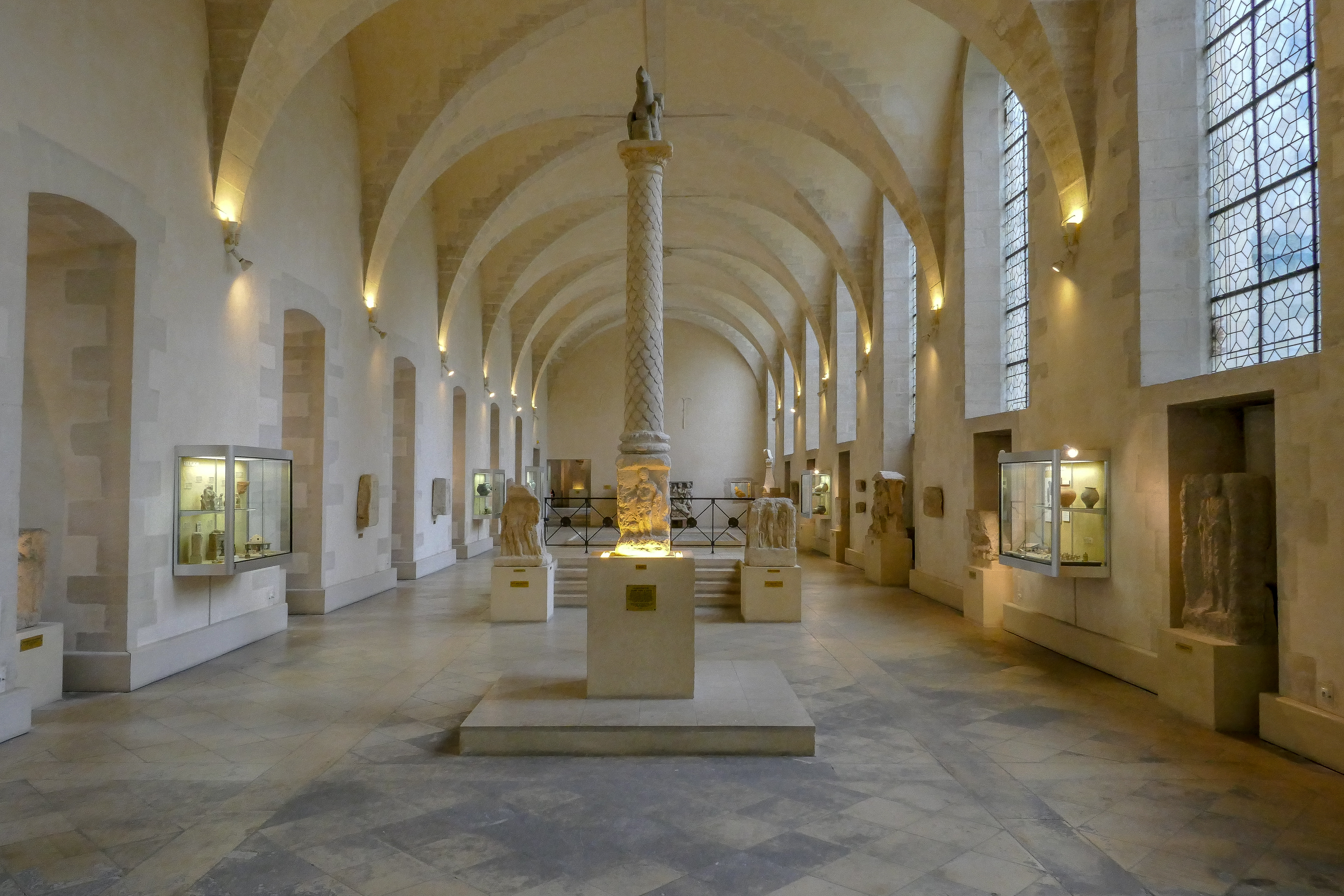

The museum contains tapestries from the 16th century donated by the archbishop Robert de Lenoncourt (uncle of the cardinal of the same name), marble capitals from the fourth century AD, furniture, jewellery, pottery, weapons and glasswork from the sixth to eighth centuries, medieval sculpture, the façade of the 13th-century musicians' House, remnants from an earlier abbey building, and also exhibits of Gallo-Roman arts and crafts and a room of pottery, jewellery and weapons from Gallic civilization, as well as an exhibit of items from the Palaeolithic to the Neolithic periods. Another section of the museum features a permanent military exhibition.
