= French ship Saint-Rémi =

History

France
- Name: Saint-Rémi

General characteristics
- Tons burthen: 400 tons

The Saint-Rémi was a 400-ton ship. Leaving Nantes, France on June 27, 1785, under the command of Captain Baudin, it departed with 325 Acadians and 16 stowaways to New Orleans, Louisiana, arriving September 10, 1785. Fifteen passengers died en route.
