= Deniére et Matelin =

Denière et Matelin were prominent French bronziers, producers of ornamental patinated and gilt-bronze objects and mounts working in Paris during the Directoire and First French Empire periods.

Named for Jean-François Denière (1774–1866) and François Thomas Matelin (1759–1815), the firm is known for the production of ormolu furniture mounts, candelabra, torchères, and ornamental mantel clocks. Suppliers to the French court before the revolution, the company, after the revolution, and before the establishment of the First Empire under First-Consul Napoleon Bonaparte, primarily exported to European courts and nobility and the emerging United States. Under the Empire government the firm regained favor in France, producing furniture mounts, candelabra, and clock cases for the homes of the regime.

== See also ==
- French Empire mantel clock
