= Palace of Tau =

UNESCO World Heritage Site
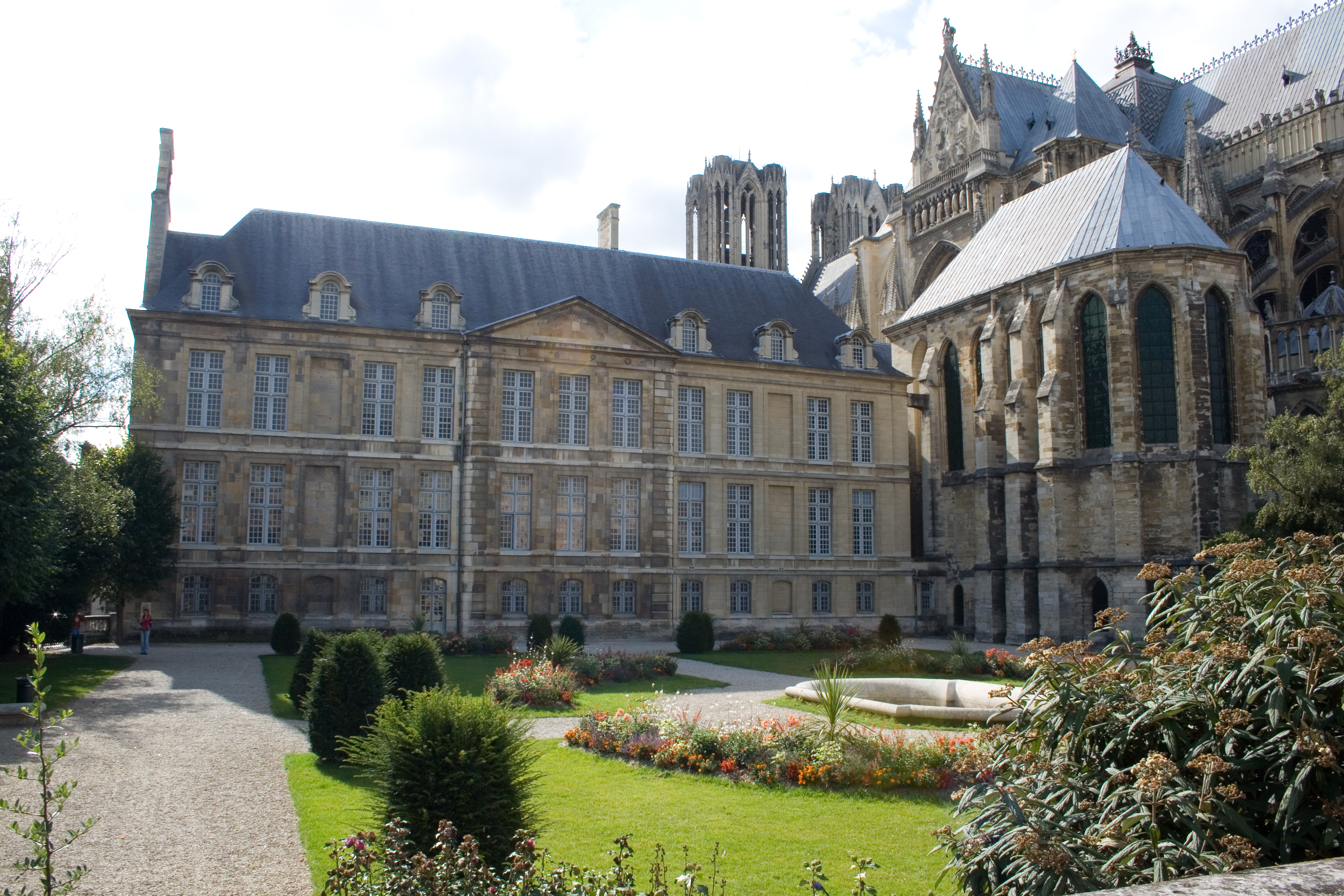
- Palace of Tau

- Location within France
- Location: Reims, France
- Part of: Cathedral of Notre-Dame, Former Abbey of Saint-Rémi and Palace of Tau, Reims
- Criteria: Cultural: i, ii, vi
- Reference: 601-002
- Inscription: 1991 (15th Session)
- Website: http://www.palais-du-tau.fr/en/
- Coordinates: 49°15′11″N 4°02′04″E

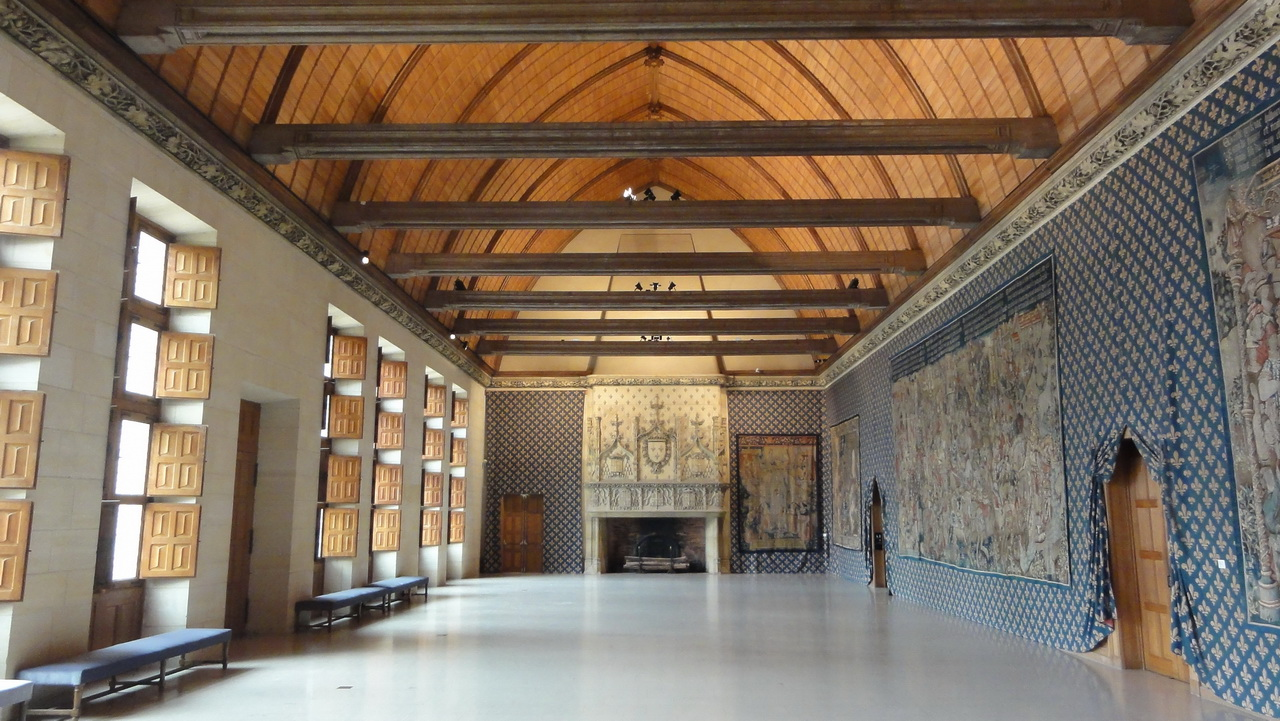
Hall of the Tau

Palace of Tau (French: Palais du Tau) in Reims, France, was the palace of the Archbishop of Reims. It is associated with the kings of France, whose coronation was held in the nearby cathedral of Notre-Dame de Reims and the following coronation banquet in the palace itself. Because of its historical importance for the French monarchy, the Palace of Tau was inscribed on the UNESCO World Heritage List in 1991. Today, it serves to host cultural events for the city of Reims. In recent years it has been the setting for Sciences Po Paris's RIMUN association's annual gala.

== History ==
A large Gallo-Roman villa still occupied the site of the palace in the 6th and 7th centuries, and later became a Carolingian palace. The first documented use of the name dates to 1131, and derives from the plan of the building, which resembles the letter Τ (tau, in the Greek alphabet). Most of the early building has disappeared: the oldest part remaining is the chapel, from 1207. The building was largely rebuilt in Gothic style between 1498 and 1509, and modified to its present Baroque appearance between 1671 and 1710 by Jules Hardouin-Mansart and Robert de Cotte. It was damaged by a fire on 19 September 1914, and not repaired until after the Second World War.

The Palace was the residence of the kings of France before their coronation in Notre-Dame de Reims. The king was dressed for the coronation at the palace before proceeding to the cathedral; afterwards, a banquet was held at the palace. The first recorded coronation banquet was held at the palace in 990, and the most recent in 1825.

The palace has housed the Musée de l'Œuvre since 1972, displaying statuary and tapestries from the cathedral, together with the remains of the cathedral treasury and other objects associated with the coronation of the French kings.

The Palace of Tau, together with the Cathedral of Notre-Dame and the former Abbey of Saint-Remi, became a UNESCO World Heritage Site in 1991. It attracts around 100,000 visitors each year.

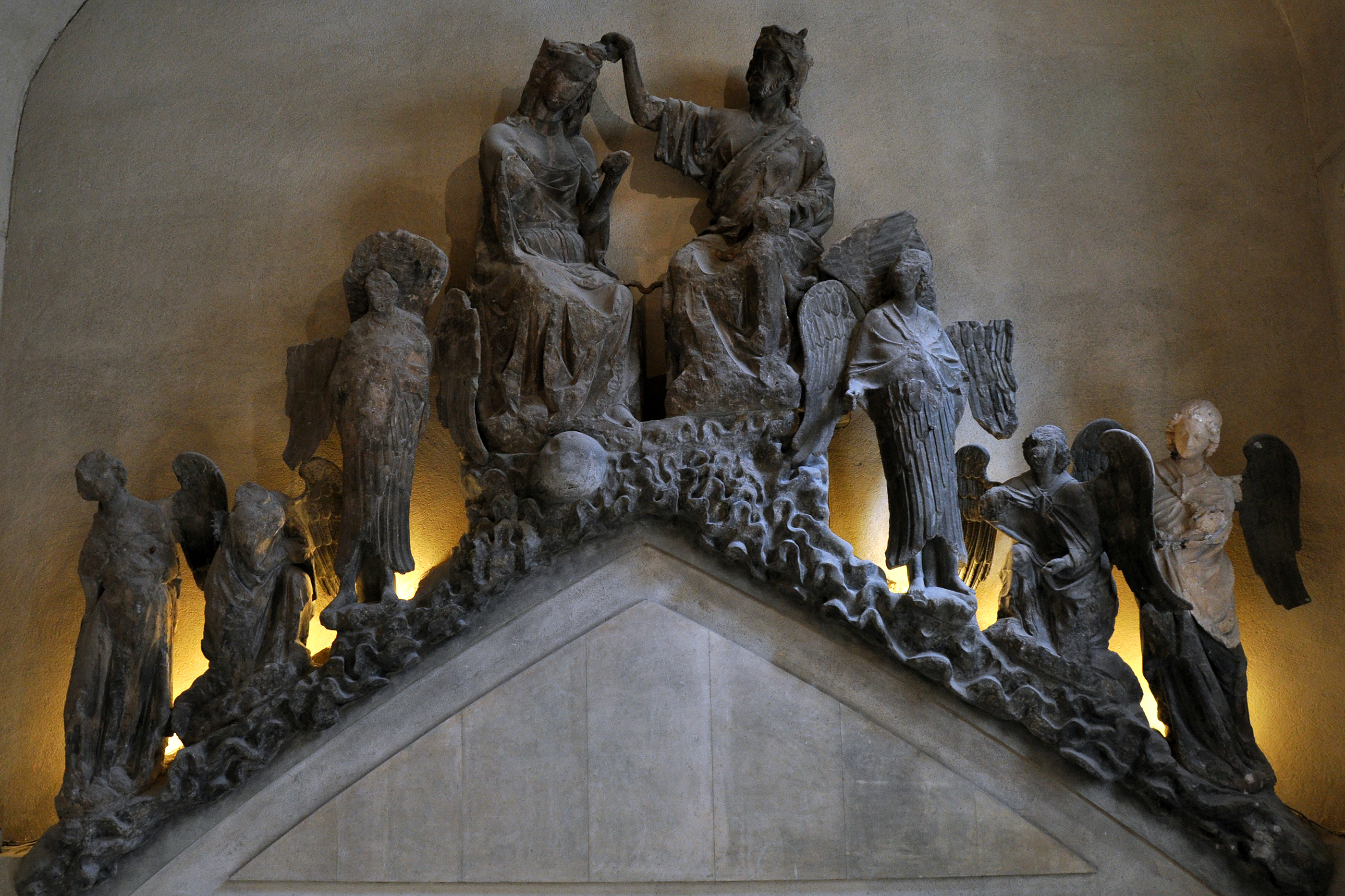
The Crowning of the Virgin Mary, original gable of the central portal of the cathedral of Reims.

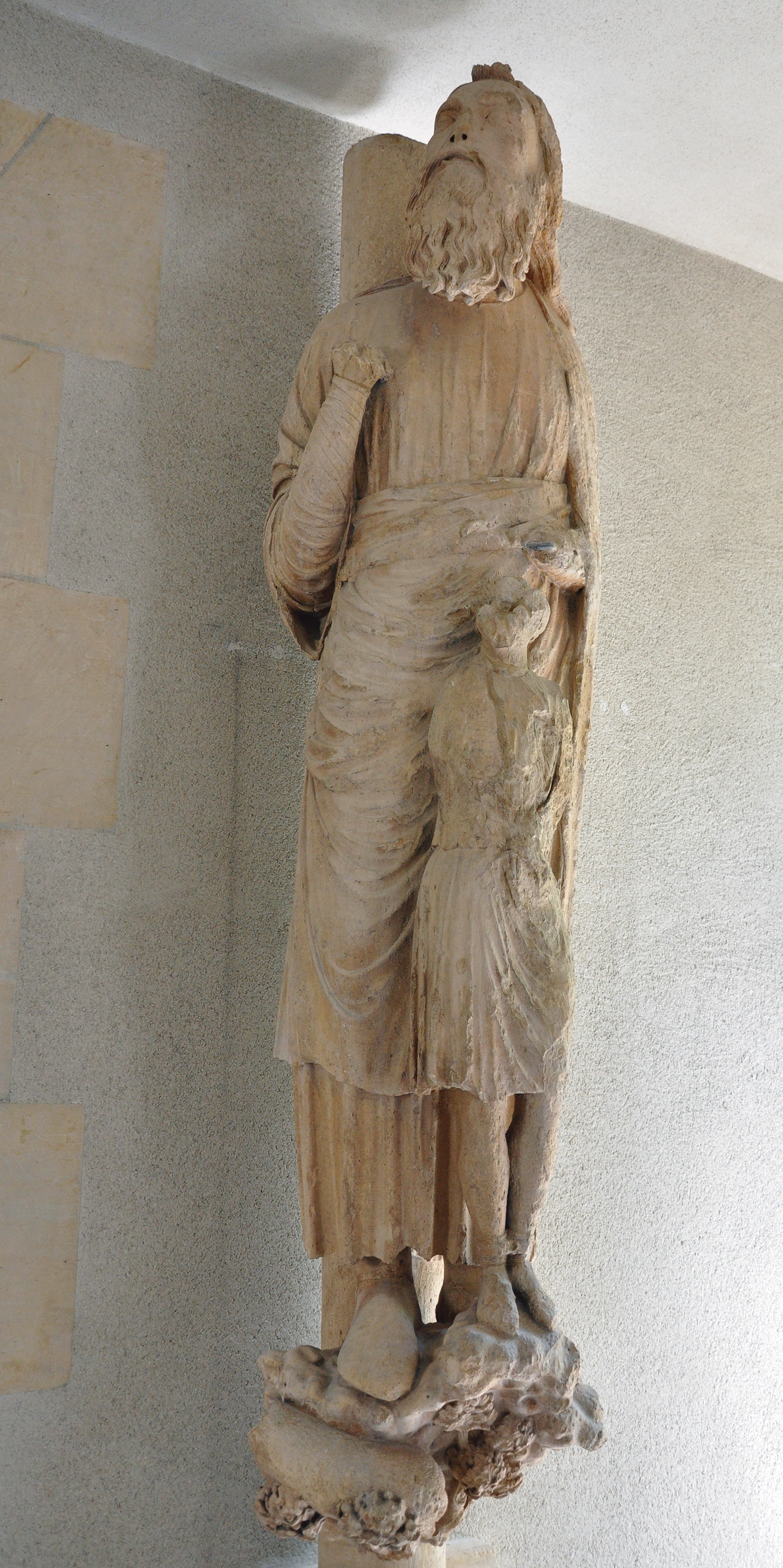
Statue of Abraham from the south portal, 1215.

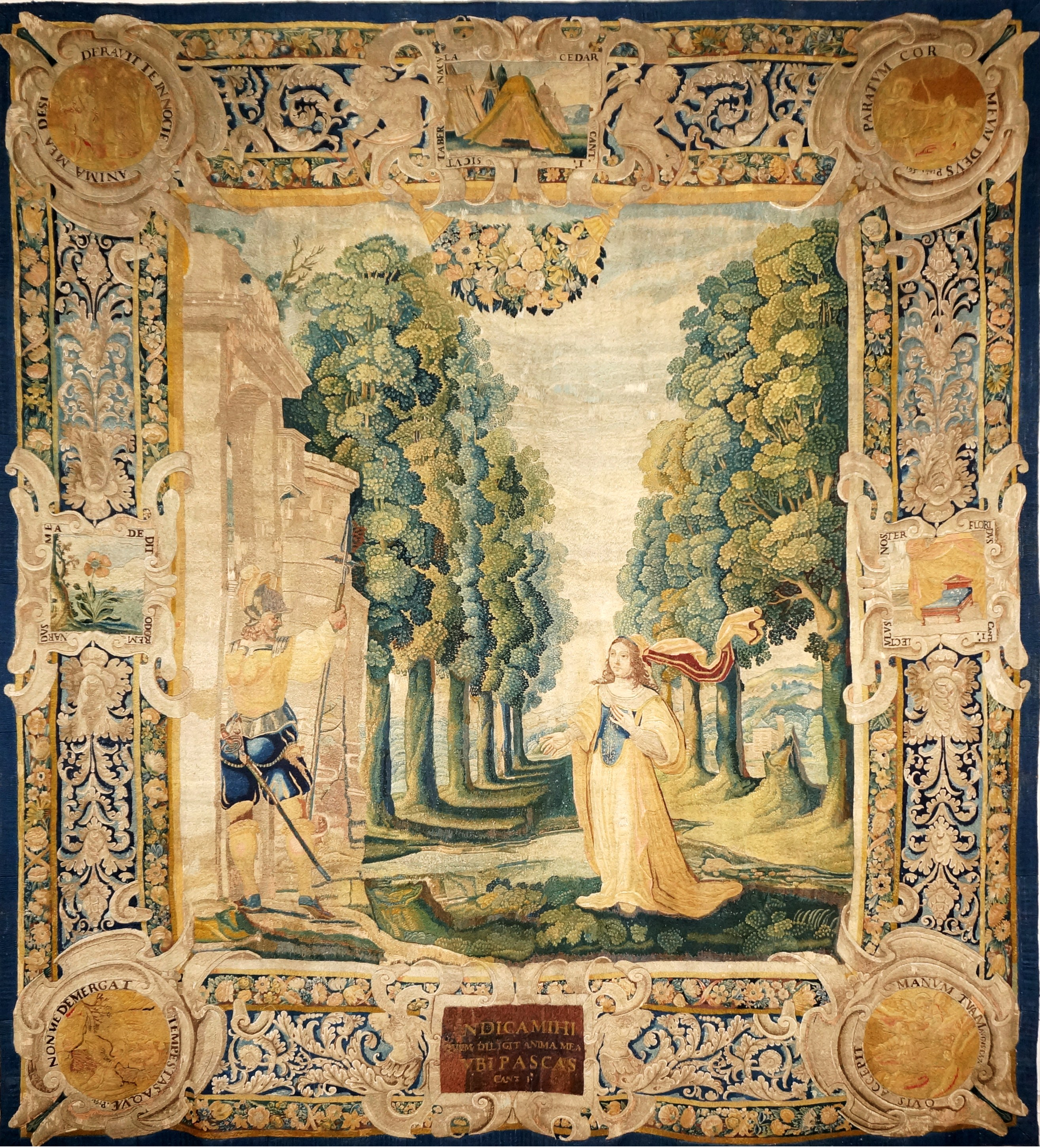
Tapestry from the Song of Songs cycle.

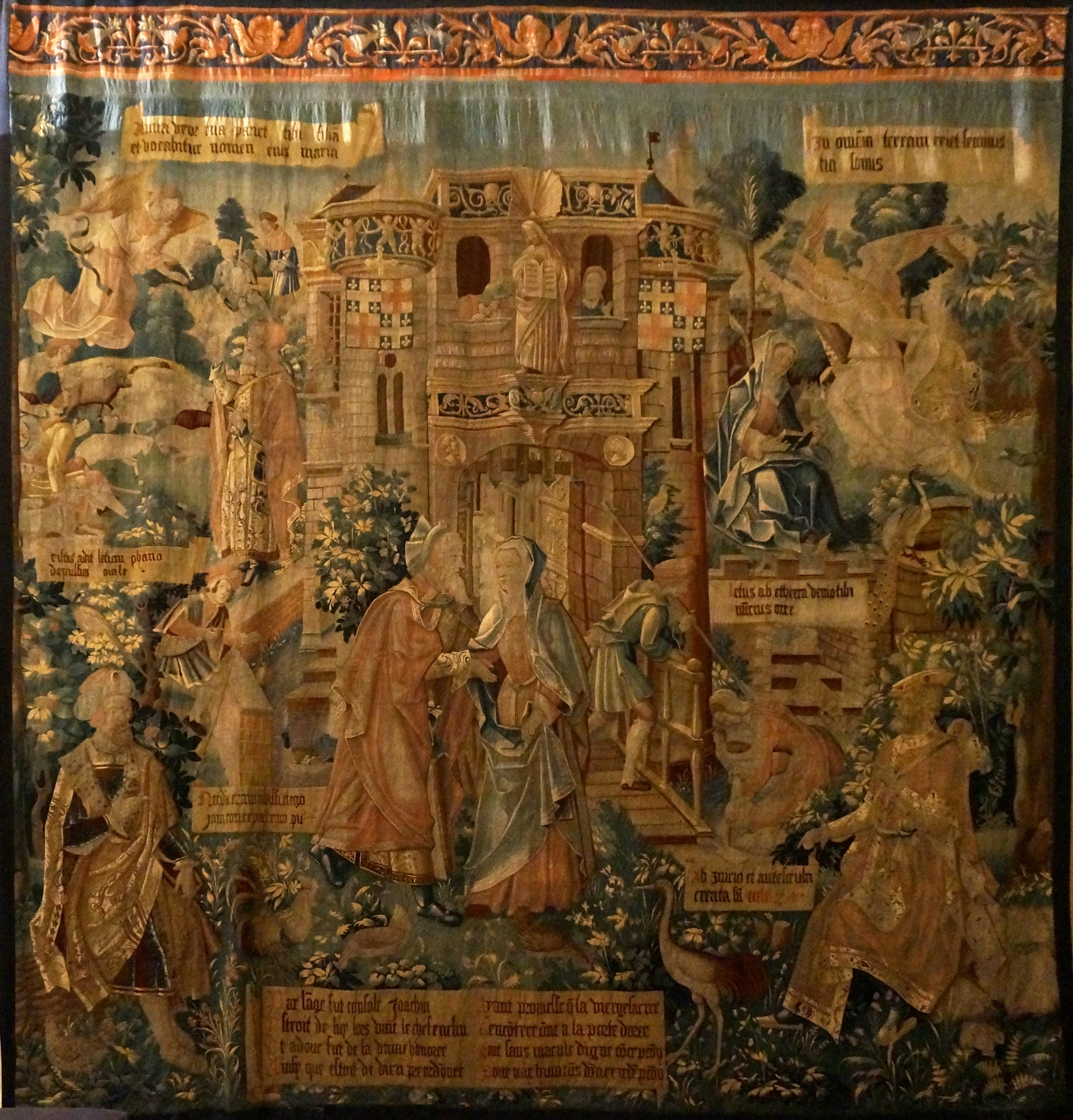
Tapestry from the Life of the Virgin, 16th c.

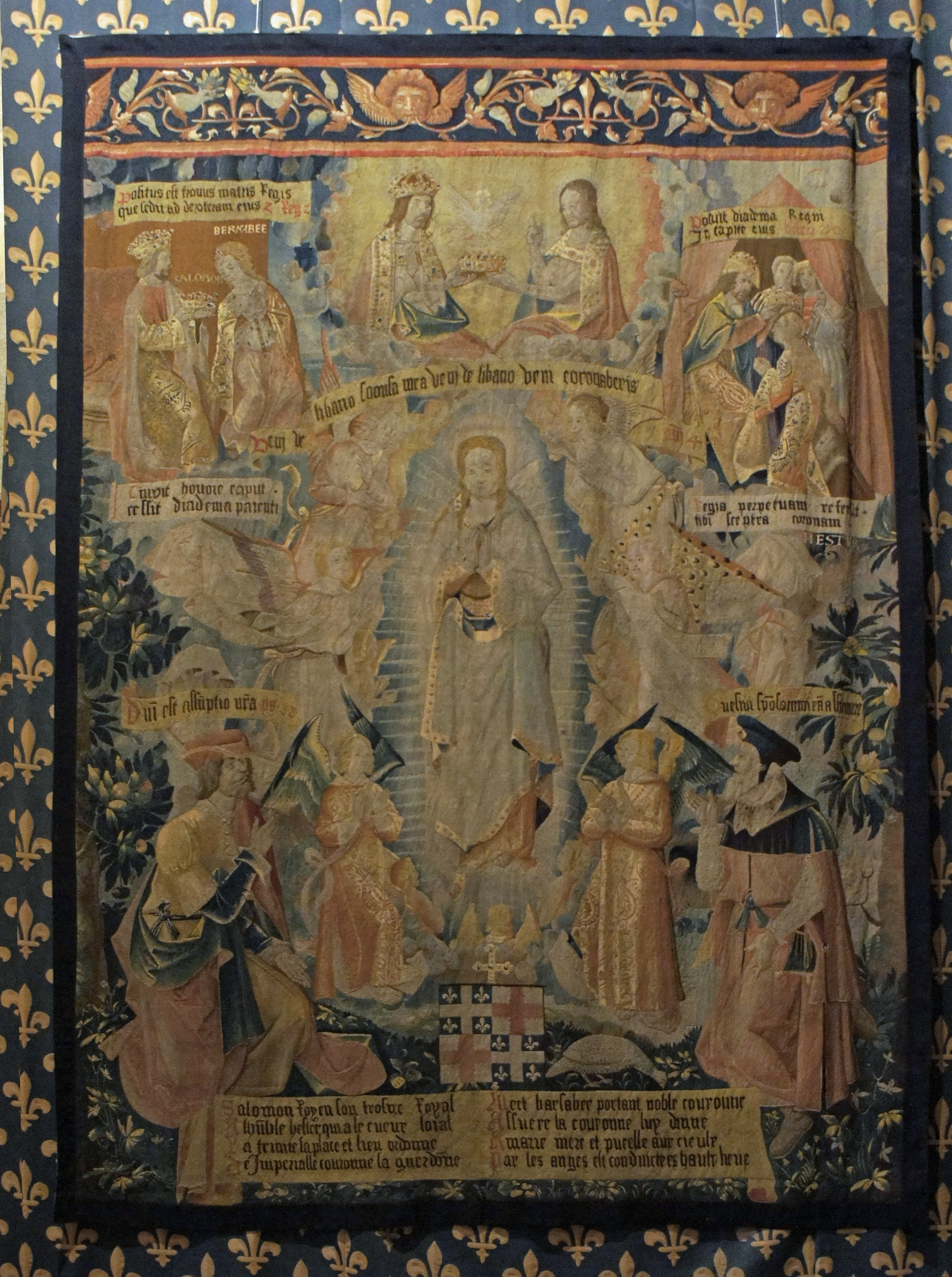
Tapestry from the Life of the Virgin, 16th c.

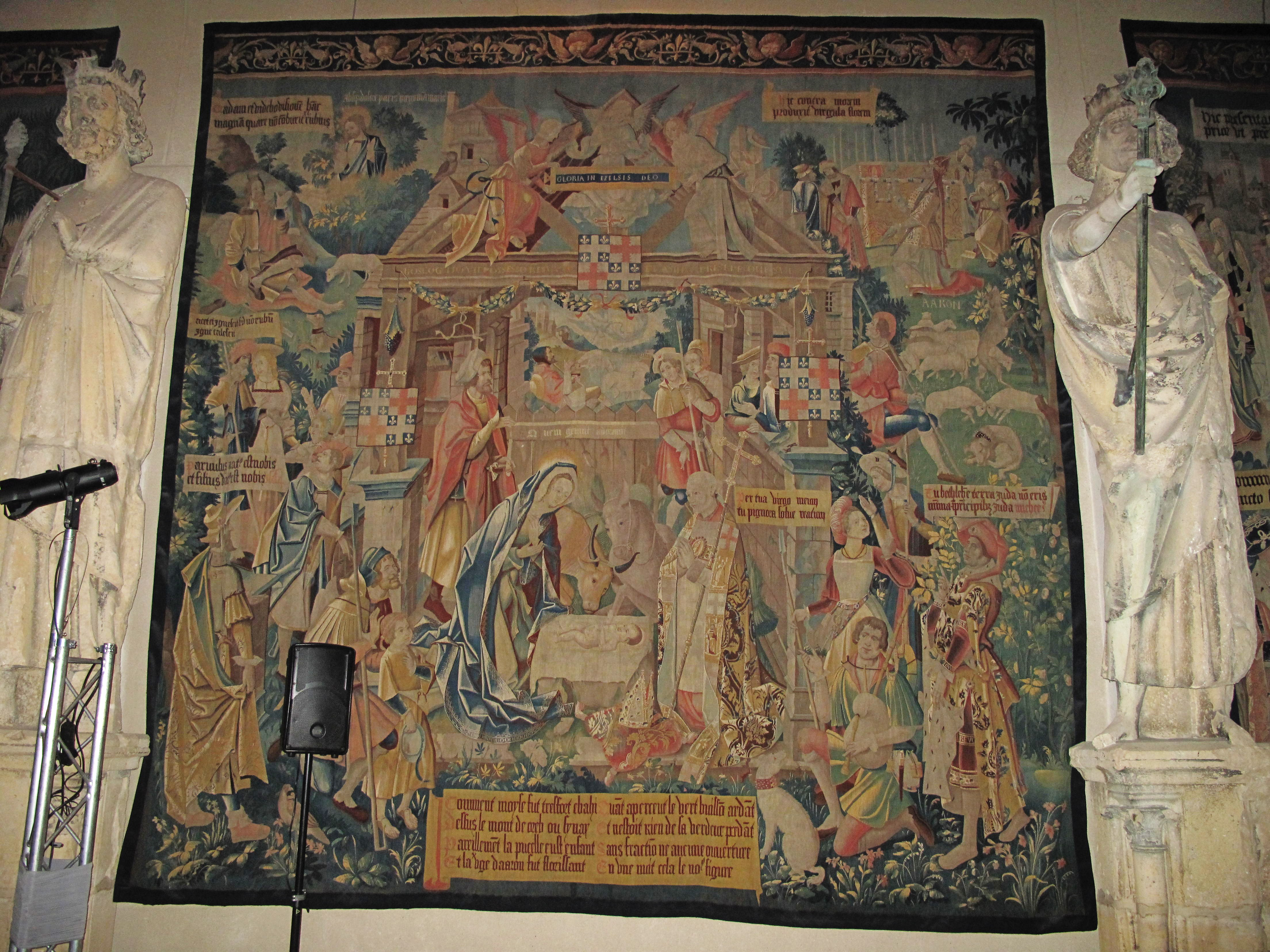
Tapestry from the Life of Christ.
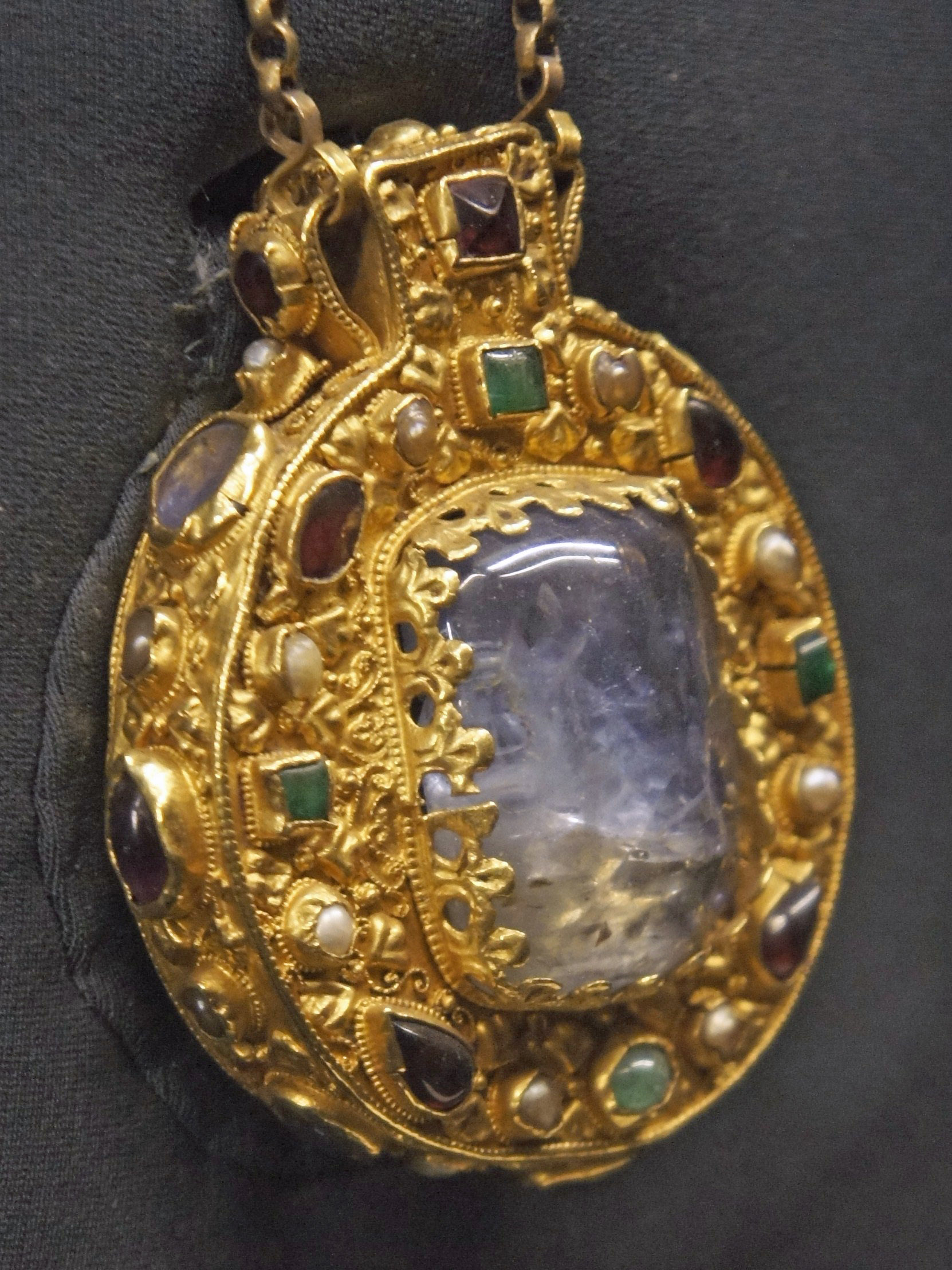
Talisman of Charlemagne, 9th c.

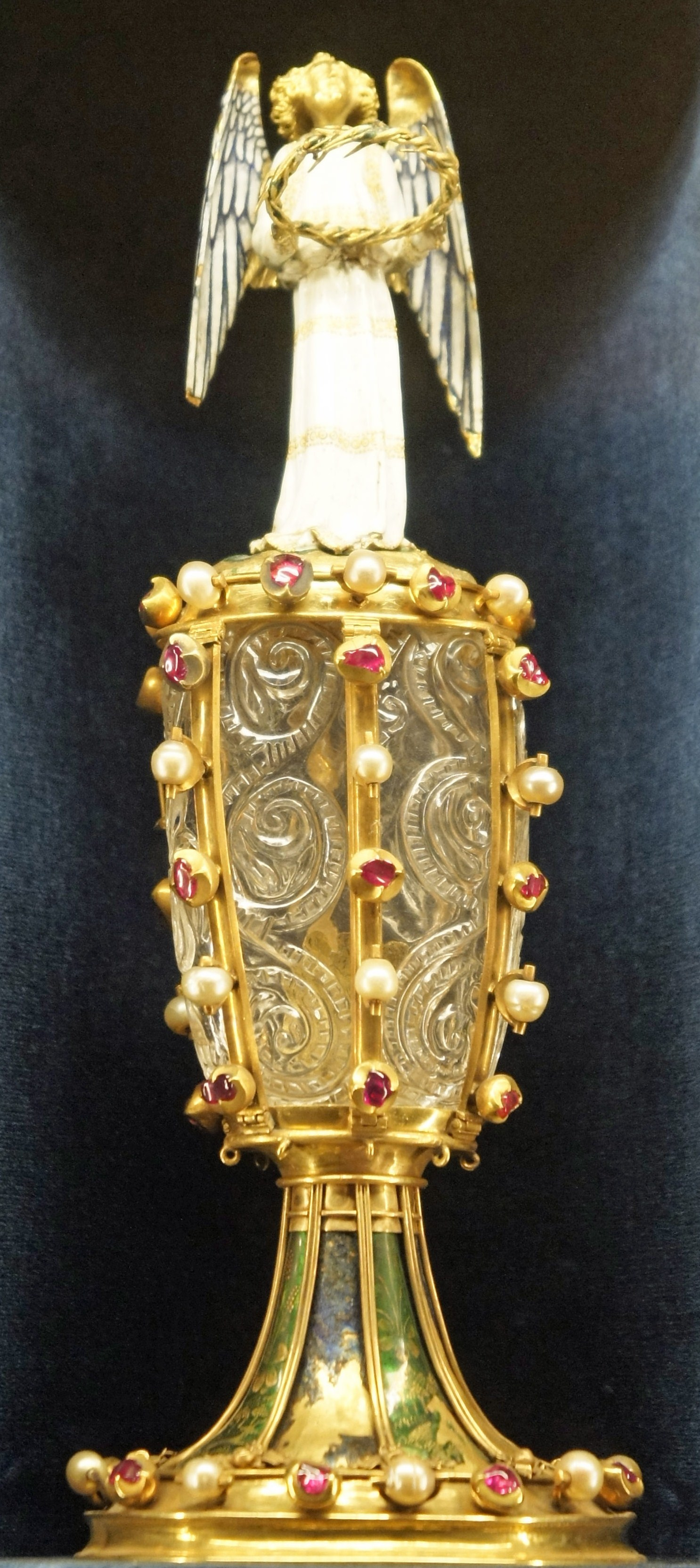
Reliquary of the Holy Thorn.

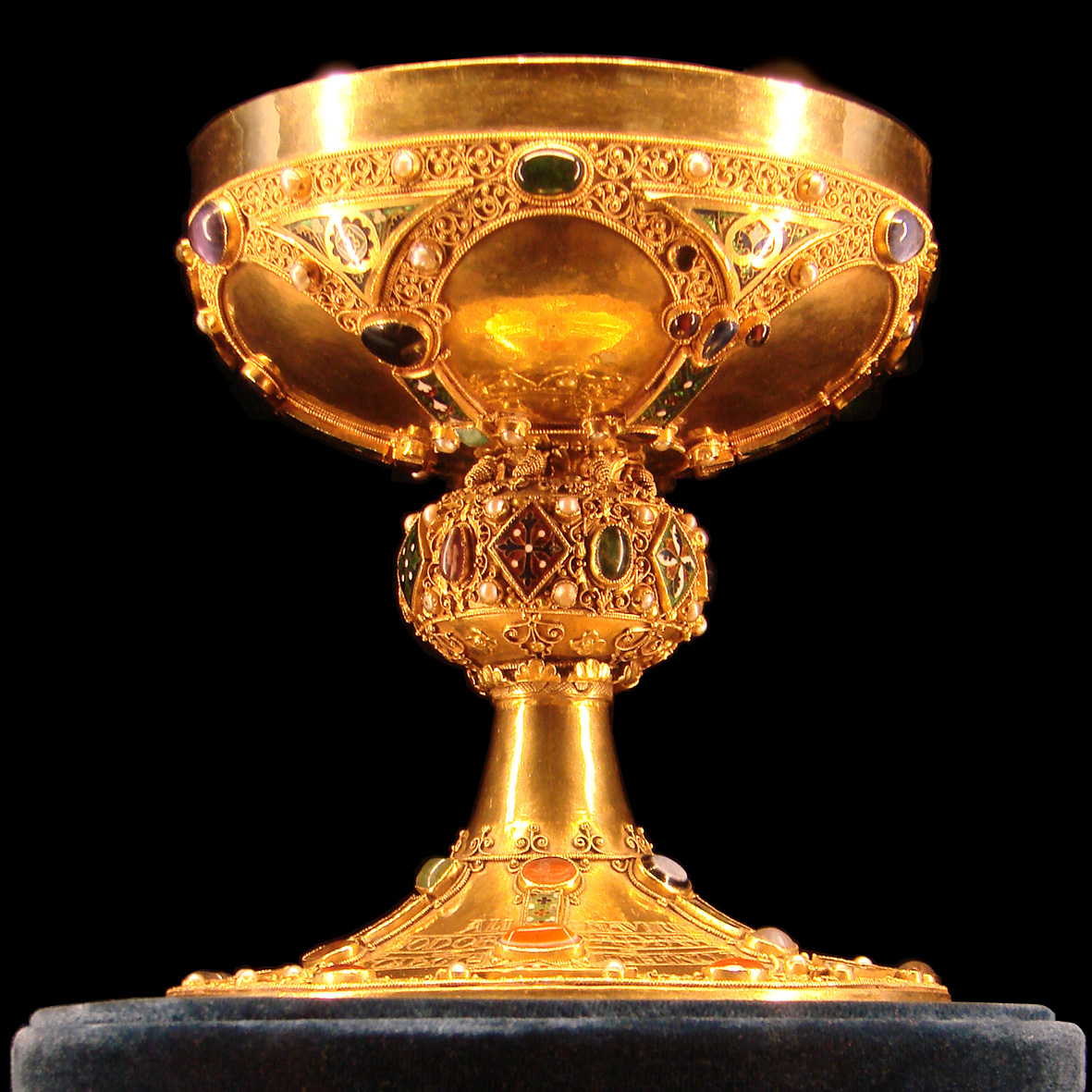
The Coronation Chalice, also known as the Chalice of Saint Remigius, 12th c.

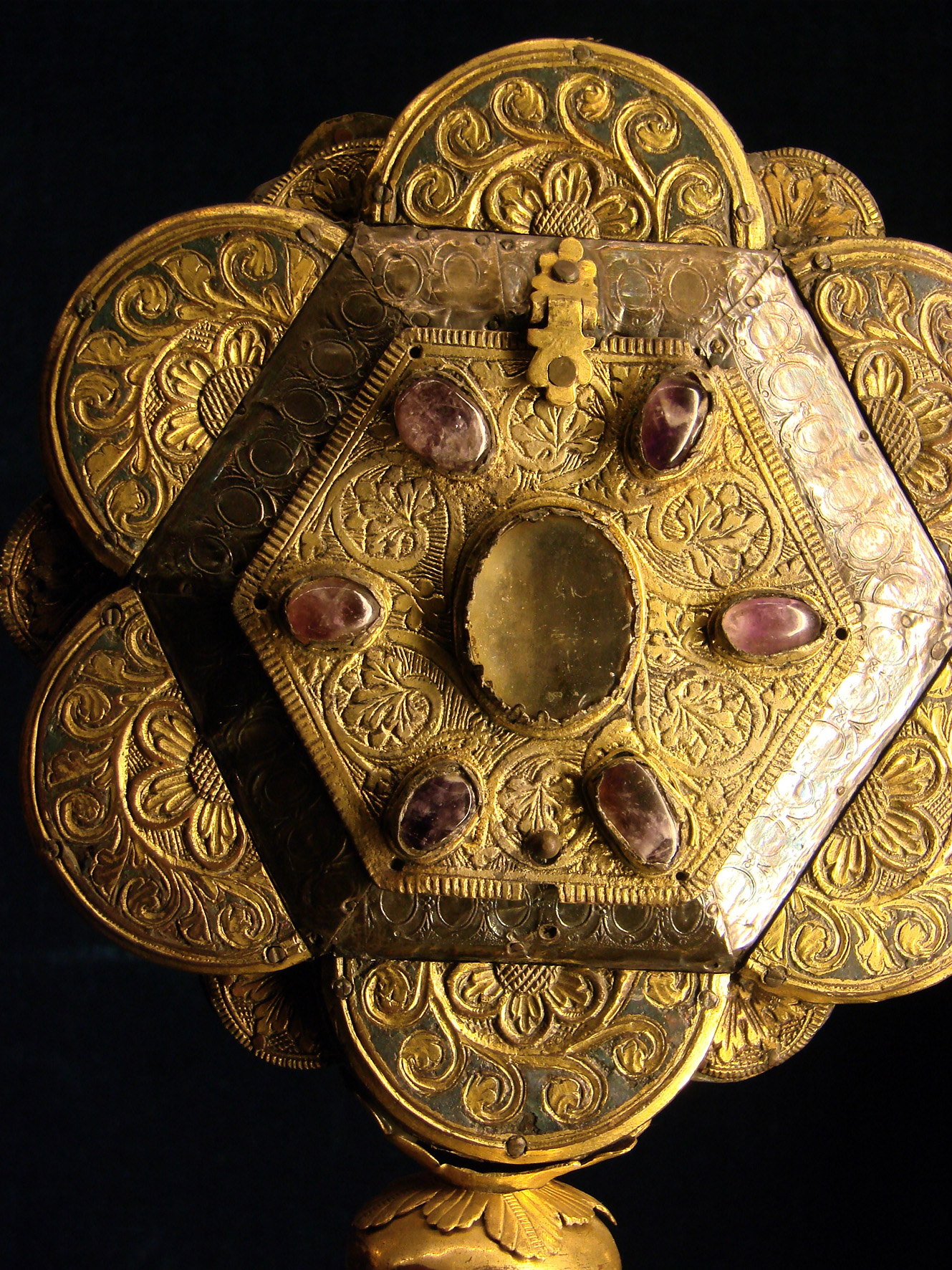
Reliquary of Sixte and Sinice, 13th c.

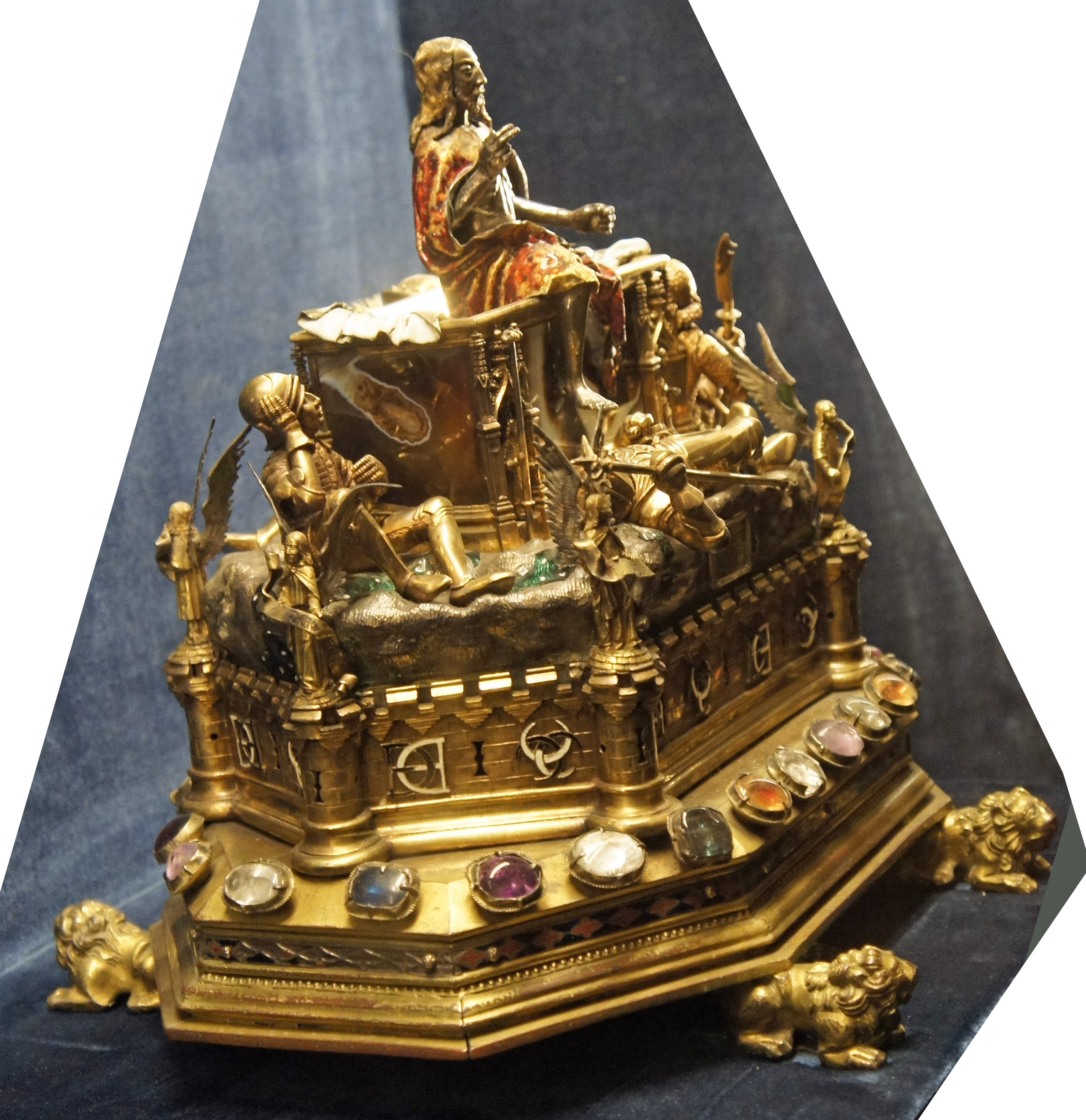
Reliquary of the Resurrection, 15th c.

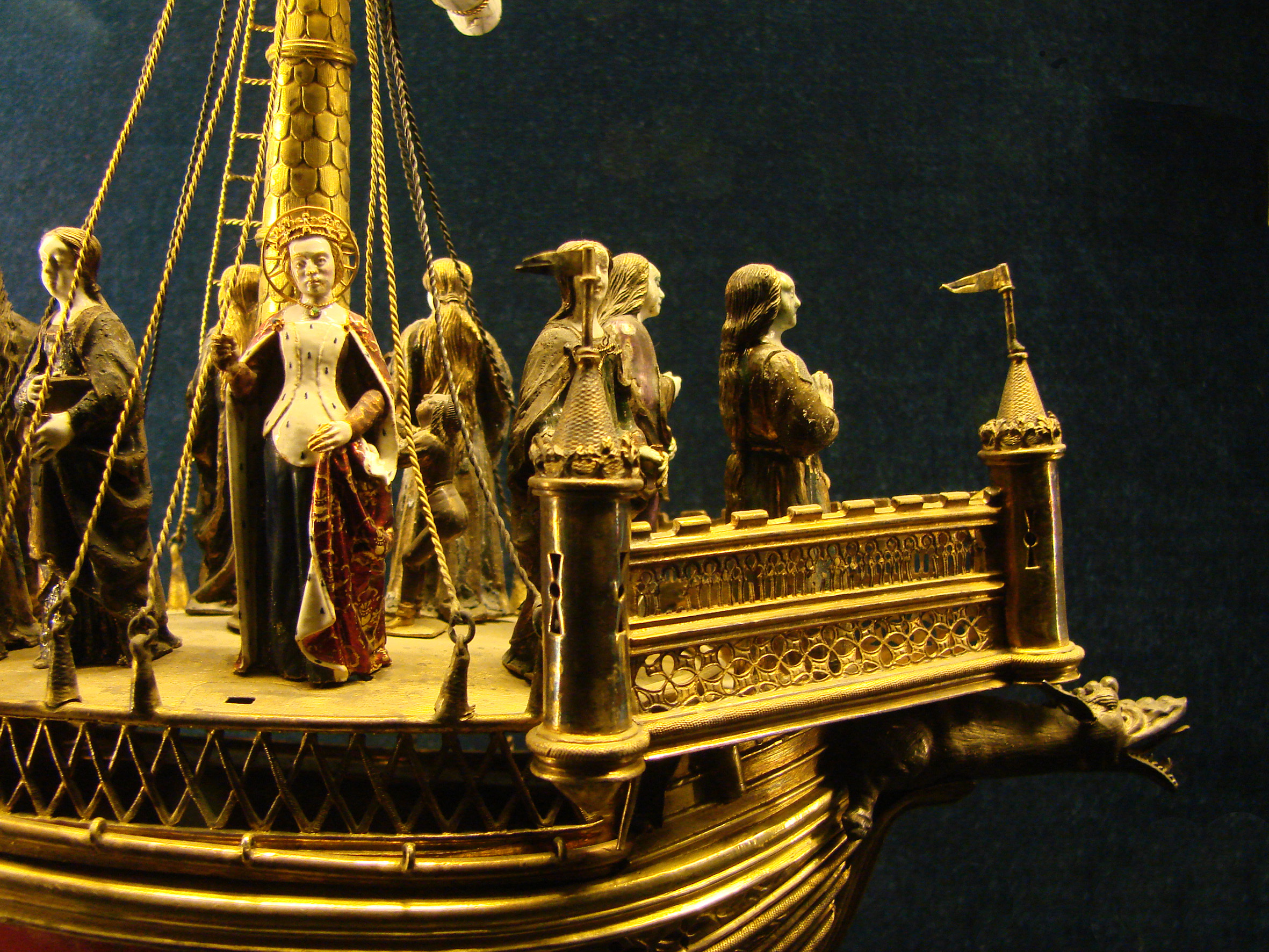
Reliquary of Saint Ursula, 15th c.

== See also ==
- Treasury of Saint-Denis
