= Coronation Portrait of Charles X =

Painting by François Gérard

Portrait of Charles X
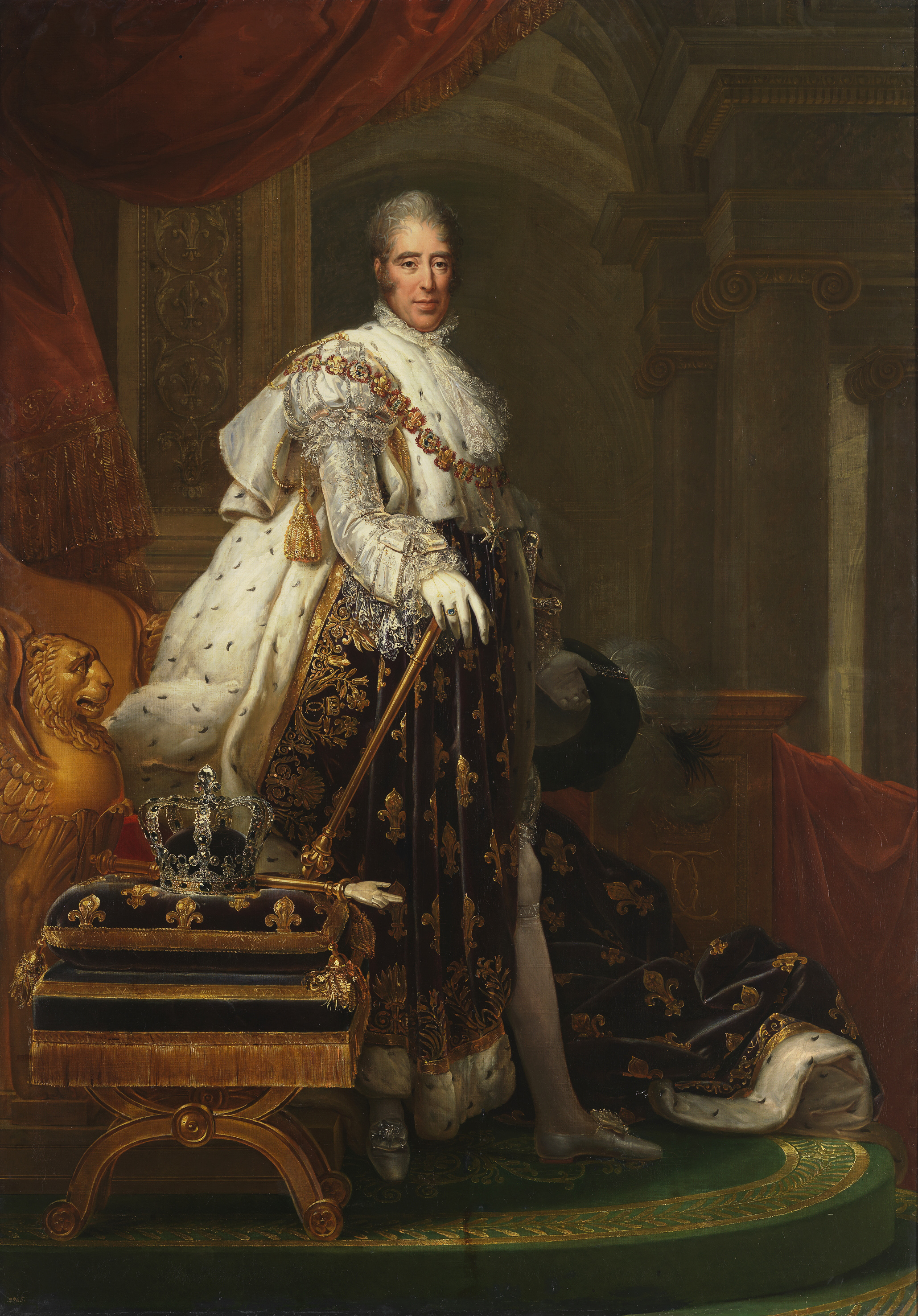
- Version in Prado Museum
- Artist: François Gérard
- Year: 1825
- Type: Oil on canvas, portrait painting
- Dimensions: 291 cm × 207 cm (115 in × 81 in)
- Location: Palace of Versailles, Versailles

Portrait of Charles X in Coronation Robes is an 1825 portrait painting by the French artist François Gérard. It depicts the reigning French monarch Charles X in his coronation robes. The Coronation of Charles X had taken place in Reims on 29 May 1825, a return to the traditional ceremony of the pre-Revolution Ancien Régime. The King appears with the crown and sceptre, wearing ermine robes and the Order of the Holy Spirit. His reactionary rule ultimately led to his overthrow in the July Revolution of 1830. Gérard was adept at navigating the political changes in France, in his time painting portraits of Napoleon I, Louis XVIII and Louis Philippe I.

It was commissioned for 12,000 francs. The original painting was completed some months before the coronation and given subsequently to the Prince de Talleyrand , Grand Chamberlain of France. It is now in a private British Collection. Other versions, produced by the artist with varying degrees of participation by Gérard himself include one in the collection of the Palace of Versailles. A version, presented to Ferdinand VII of Spain, is also in the Prado Museum in Madrid. Another version is at Apsley House, the London residence of the Duke of Wellington, while the dowager Marchioness of Salisbury purchased one directly from the artist - this is now in the collection at Hatfield House. In 1827 Gérard produced a history painting The Coronation of Charles X depicting the coronation ceremony.

== See also ==
- Portrait of Charles X, an 1825 portrait by Thomas Lawrence

== Bibliography ==
- Jones, Colin. The Cambridge Illustrated History of France. ISBN 0521669928. Cambridge University Press, 1999.
- Oppenheimer, Margaret J. The French Portrait: Revolution to Restoration. ISBN 0873910559. Smith College Museum of Art, 2005.
- Price, Munro. The Perilous Crown: France Between Revolutions, 1814-1848. ISBN 1405040823. Pan Macmillan, 2010.
- Ziolkowski, Theodore. Stages of European Romanticism: Cultural Synchronicity Across the Arts, 1798-1848. ISBN 1640140425. Boydell & Brewer, 2018.
