= Portrait of Charles X =

1825 painting by Thomas Lawrence

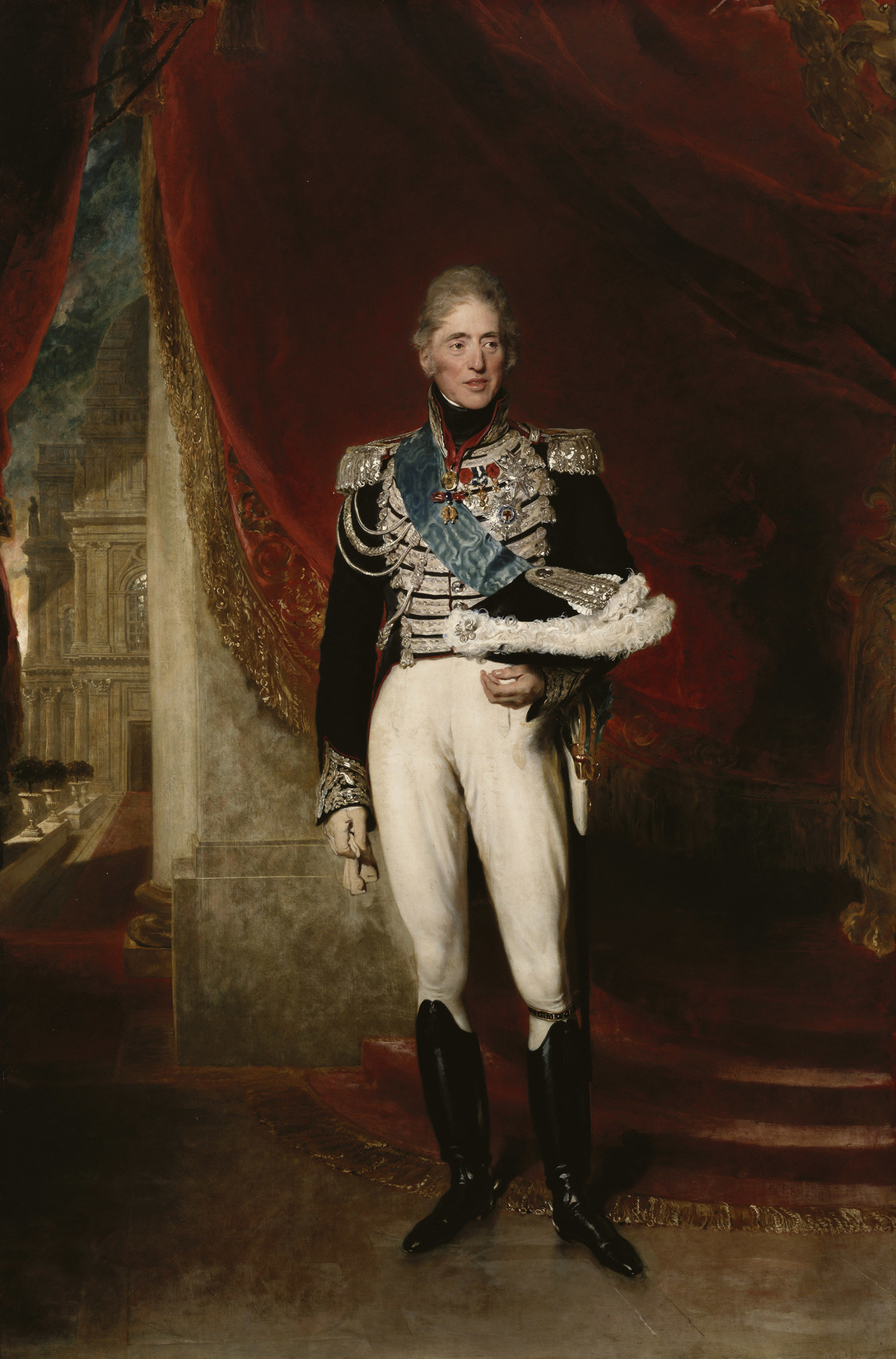
- Artist: Thomas Lawrence
- Year: 1825
- Type: Oil on canvas, portrait
- Dimensions: 269.7 cm × 178.3 cm (106.2 in × 70.2 in)
- Location: Royal Collection, Windsor Castle

Portrait of Charles X is an 1825 portrait painting by the British artist Sir Thomas Lawrence depicting the reigning French monarch Charles X. Following the French Revolution that saw his eldest brother overthrown and executed, Charles had spent many years in exile including a period in Britain. His brother Louis XVIII was restored to the throne with British assistance in 1814 and then again in 1815 following the Battle of Waterloo. Charles, as his heir, led the conservative Ultra-royalist faction in French politics. When his brother died in 1824 he succeeded to the throne. The last member of the main House of Bourbon to reign, he had an elaborate coronation in Reims in May 1825. The same year Charles was painted in his coronation robes by the French artist Robert Lefèvre.

== Commission ==
Lawrence had exhibited paintings at the Salon of 1824 at the Louvre. He was commissioned by the British monarch George IV to paint Charles. He had received numerous commissions from George and had previously painted many European leaders at the 1818 Congress of Aix-la-Chapelle. It had been intended for him to paint Charles's brother Louis XVIII before his death. Lawrence was paid five hundred guineas each for this portrait and another depicting Charles' son the Duke of Angoulême. It portrays Charles in military uniform wearing the orders including the Garter and the Golden Fleece against the background of the Tuileries Palace. Lawrence was decorated with the Legion of Honour by Charles. Charles was subsequently overthrown in the 1830 Revolution against his rule and went into exile.

== Provenance ==
George IV initially hung the portrait at St James' Palace in London, but by the reign of his niece Victoria in the 1840s it was displayed in the Waterloo Chamber at Windsor Castle where it still hangs today as part of the Royal Collection.

== See also ==
- Portrait of the Duke of Berry, 1820 portrait of Charles's son by François Gérard
- Portrait of George IV, Lawrence's 1821 coronation portrait of George IV
- Coronation Portrait of Charles X, 1825 portrait by François Gérard

== Bibliography ==
- James, Ralph N. Painters and Their Works: A Dictionary of Great Artists who are Not Now Alive, Giving Their Names, Lives, and the Prices Paid for Their Works at Auctions, Volume 2. ISBN 1295315203. L.U. Gill, 1897.
- Levey, Michael. Sir Thomas Lawrence. ISBN 0300109989. Yale University Press, 2005.
