= Charles X of France =

King of France from 1824 to 1830

Charles X
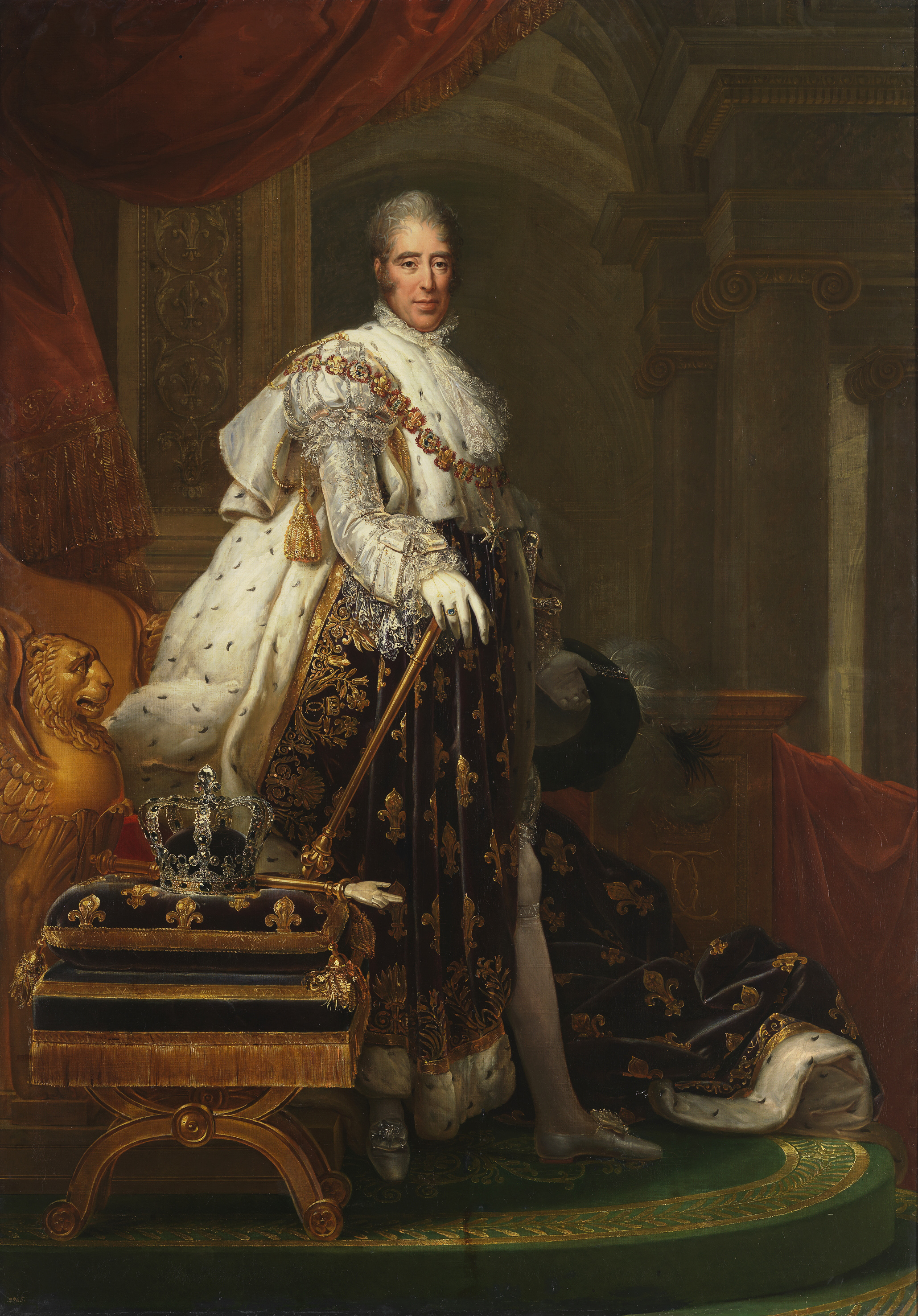
- Coronation Portrait of Charles X (1825)

King of France
- Reign: 16 September 1824 – 2 August 1830
- Coronation: 29 May 1825; Reims Cathedral
- Predecessor: Louis XVIII
- Successor: Louis XIX (not proclaimed); Henry V (not proclaimed); Louis Philippe I as King of the French

Legitimist pretender to the French throne
- Pretence: 2 August 1830 – 6 November 1836
- Successor: Louis Antoine, Duke of Angoulême
- Born: Charles Philippe, Count of Artois; 9 October 1757; Palace of Versailles, France
- Died: 6 November 1836 (aged 79); Görz, Austrian Empire
- Burial: Kostanjevica Monastery, Slovenia
- Spouse: Marie Thérèse of Savoy (m. 1773; died 1805)
- Issue Detail: Louis Antoine, Duke of Angoulême; Sophie, Mademoiselle d'Artois; Charles Ferdinand, Duke of Berry; Marie Thérèse, Mademoiselle d'Angoulême
- House: Bourbon
- Father: Louis, Dauphin of France
- Mother: Maria Josepha of Saxony
- Religion: Catholicism

Charles X (Charles Philippe; 9 October 1757 – 6 November 1836) was King of France from 16 September 1824 until 2 August 1830. An uncle of the uncrowned Louis XVII and younger brother to former reigning kings Louis XVI and Louis XVIII, he supported the latter in exile. After the Bourbon Restoration in 1814, Charles (as heir presumptive) became the leader of the ultra-royalists, a radical monarchist faction within the French court that affirmed absolute monarchy by divine right and opposed the constitutional monarchy, republicanism, any concessions towards liberals, and the guarantees of civil liberties granted by the Charter of 1814. Charles gained influence within the French court after the assassination of his son Charles Ferdinand, Duke of Berry, in 1820 and succeeded his brother Louis XVIII in 1824.

At his coronation in 1825, he tried to revive the practice of the royal touch. The governments appointed under his reign reimbursed former landowners for the abolition of feudalism at the expense of bondholders — i.e., middle-class French citizens — increased the power of the Catholic Church, and reimposed capital punishment for sacrilege, leading to conflict with the liberal-majority Chamber of Deputies.

Charles approved the French conquest of Algeria as a way to distract his citizens from domestic problems, and forced Haiti to pay a hefty indemnity in return for lifting a blockade and recognizing Haiti's independence. He eventually appointed a conservative government under the premiership of Prince Jules de Polignac, who was defeated in the 1830 French legislative election. He responded with the July Ordinances disbanding the Chamber of Deputies, limiting franchise, and reimposing press censorship. Within a week, Paris faced urban riots which led to the July Revolution of 1830, which resulted in his abdication and the election of Louis Philippe I as King of the French. He was the last of the French rulers from the senior branch of the House of Bourbon. Exiled once again, Charles died in 1836 in Gorizia, then part of the Austrian Empire.

== Childhood and adolescence ==
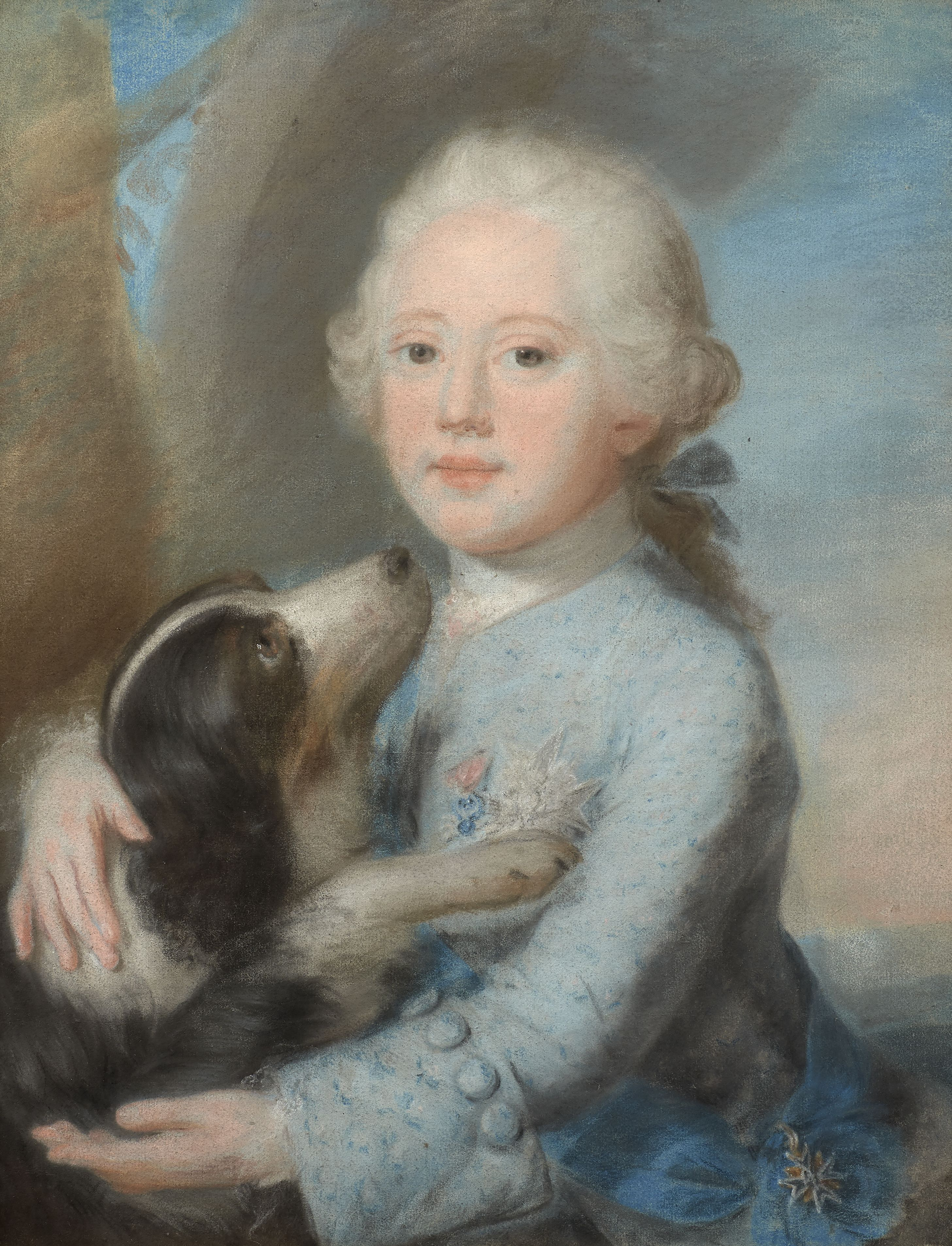
Portrait of Charles-Philippe by Catherine Read, 1764

Charles Philippe of France was born in 1757, the youngest son of the Dauphin Louis and his wife, the Dauphine Marie Josèphe, at the Palace of Versailles. Charles was created Count of Artois at birth by his grandfather, the reigning King Louis XV. As the youngest male in the family, Charles seemed unlikely ever to become king. His eldest brother, Louis, Duke of Burgundy, died unexpectedly in 1761, which moved Charles up one place in the line of succession. He was raised in early childhood by Madame de Marsan, the Governess of the Children of France.

At the death of his father in 1765, Charles's oldest surviving brother, Louis Auguste, became the new Dauphin (the heir apparent to the French throne). Their mother Marie Josèphe, who never recovered from the loss of her husband, died in March 1767 from tuberculosis. This left Charles an orphan at the age of nine, along with his siblings Louis Auguste, Louis Stanislas, Count of Provence, Clotilde ("Madame Clotilde"), and Élisabeth ("Madame Élisabeth"). Louis XV fell ill on 27 April 1774 and died on 10 May of smallpox at the age of 64. His grandson Louis-Auguste succeeded him as King Louis XVI.

== Marriage and private life ==
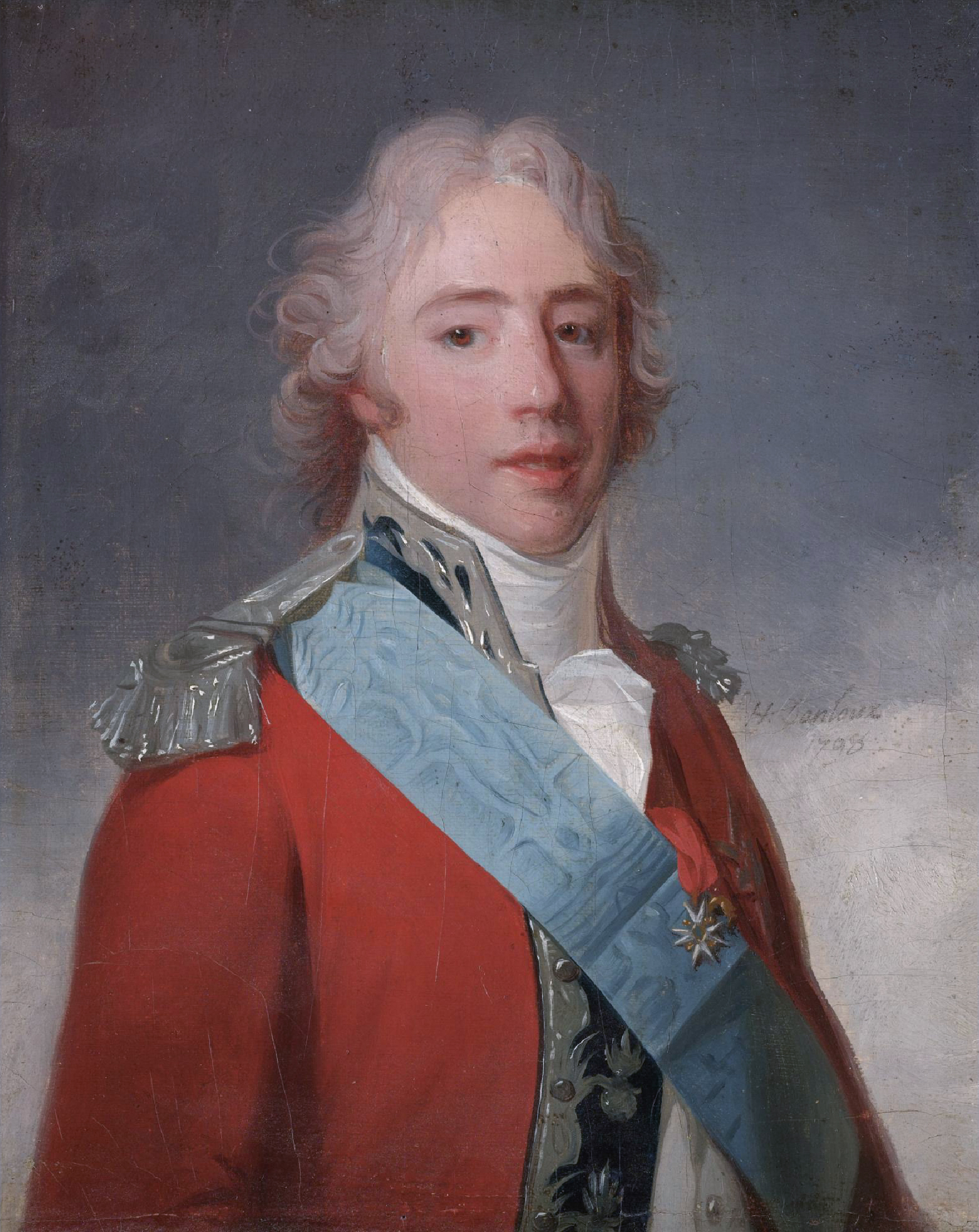
Charles as Count of Artois in 1798, by Henri-Pierre Danloux

In November 1773, Charles married Marie Thérèse of Savoy. In 1775, Marie Thérèse gave birth to a boy, Louis Antoine, who was created Duke of Angoulême by Louis XVI. Louis-Antoine was the first of the next generation of Bourbons, as the king and the Count of Provence had not fathered any children yet, causing the Parisian libellistes (pamphleteers who published scandalous leaflets about important figures in court and politics) to lampoon Louis XVI's alleged impotence. Three years later, in 1778, Charles' second son, Charles Ferdinand, was born and given the title of Duke of Berry.

Also in 1778, Queen Marie Antoinette gave birth to her first child, Marie Thérèse, quelling all rumours that she could not bear children. Charles was thought of as the most attractive member of his family, bearing a strong resemblance to his grandfather Louis XV. His wife was considered quite ugly by most contemporaries, and he looked for company in numerous extramarital affairs. According to the Count of Hézecques, "few beauties were cruel to him". Among his lovers was notably Anne Victoire Dervieux. Later, he embarked upon a lifelong love affair with the beautiful Louise de Polastron, the sister-in-law of Marie Antoinette's closest companion, the Duchess of Polignac.

Charles struck up a firm friendship with Marie Antoinette herself, whom he had first met upon her arrival in France in April 1770 when he was twelve. The closeness of the relationship was such that he was falsely accused by Parisian rumour mongers of having seduced her. As part of Marie Antoinette's social set, Charles often appeared opposite her in the private theatre of her favourite royal retreat, the Petit Trianon. They were both said to be very talented amateur actors. Marie Antoinette played milkmaids, shepherdesses, and country ladies, whereas Charles played lovers, valets, and farmers.

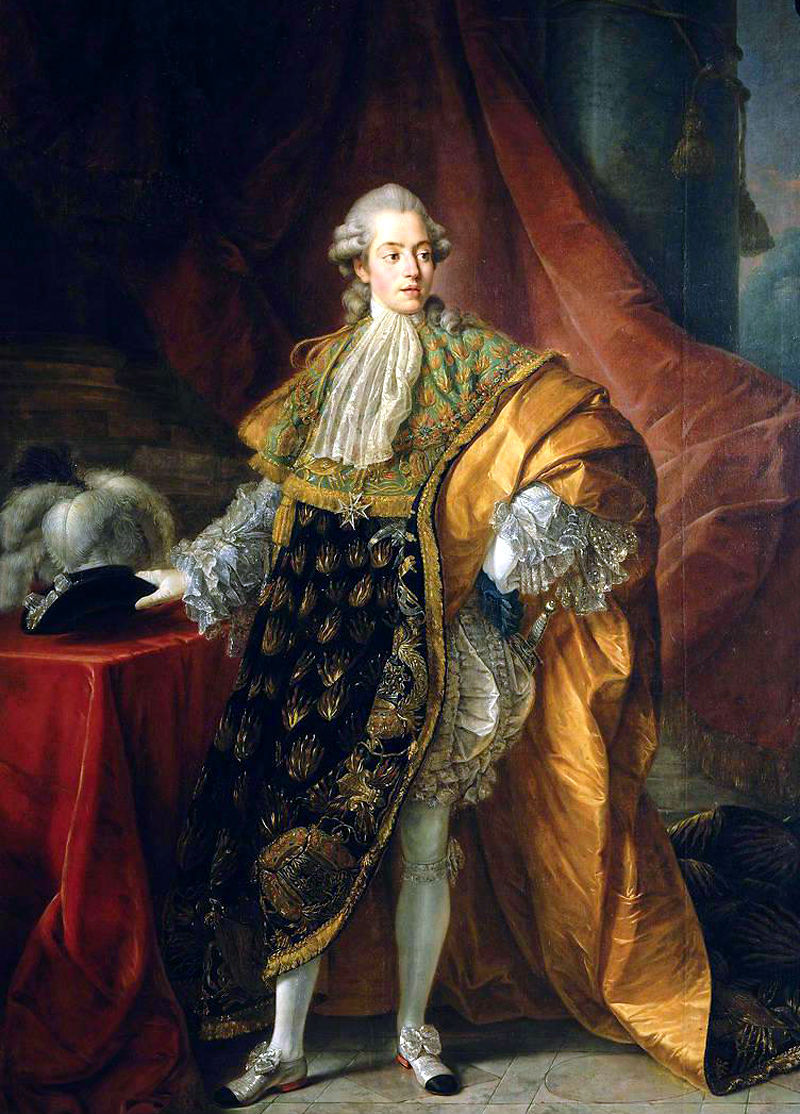
Portrait of the Count of Artois (future Charles X) in the habit of the Order of the Holy Spirit, by Antoine-François Callet, c. 1775

A famous story concerning the two involves the construction of the Château de Bagatelle. In 1775, Charles purchased a small hunting lodge in the Bois de Boulogne. He soon had the existing house torn down with plans to rebuild. Marie Antoinette wagered her brother-in-law that the new château could not be completed within three months. Charles engaged the neoclassical architect François-Joseph Bélanger to design the building. He won his bet, with Bélanger completing the house in sixty-three days. It is estimated that the project, which came to include manicured gardens, cost over two million livres. Throughout the 1770s, Charles spent lavishly. He accumulated enormous debts, totalling 21 million livres. In the 1780s, King Louis XVI paid off the debts of both his brothers, the Counts of Provence and Artois.

In March 1778, Charles caused a scandal when he assaulted the Duchess of Bourbon, Bathilde d'Orléans, at a masked ball, while "escorting [Madame] Canillac, a lady of the town ... After exchanging a few words, the irritated Duchess reached up and snatched off his mask whereupon he pulled her nose so hard and painfully that she wept." Her husband, Louis Henri, Prince of Condé, challenged him to a duel, during which Charles was wounded in the hand. When the Bourbons later attended a play, they were received with "enthusiastic cheers", although the two men were reconciled the next year. This affair became known as: An Incident at the Opera Ball on Mardi Gras in 1778. In 1781, Charles acted as a proxy for Holy Roman Emperor Joseph II at the christening of his godson, the Dauphin Louis Joseph.

== Crisis and French Revolution ==
Charles's political awakening started with the first great crisis of the monarchy in 1786, when it became apparent that the kingdom was bankrupt from previous military endeavours (in particular the Seven Years' War and the American War of Independence) and needed fiscal reform to survive. Charles supported the removal of the aristocracy's financial privileges, but was opposed to any reduction in the social privileges enjoyed by either the Catholic Church or the nobility. He believed that France's finances should be reformed without the monarchy being overthrown. In his own words, it was "time for repair, not demolition."

King Louis XVI eventually convened the Estates General, which had not been assembled for over 150 years, to meet in May 1789 to ratify financial reforms. Along with his sister Élisabeth, Charles was the most conservative member of the family and opposed the demands of the Third Estate (representing the commoners) to increase their voting power. This prompted criticism from his brother, who accused him of being "plus royaliste que le roi" ("more royalist than the king"). In June 1789, the representatives of the Third Estate declared themselves a National Assembly intent on providing France with a new constitution.

In conjunction with the Baron de Breteuil, Charles had political alliances arranged to depose the liberal minister of finance Jacques Necker. These plans backfired when Charles attempted to secure Necker's dismissal on 11 July without Breteuil's knowledge, much earlier than they had originally intended. It was the beginning of a decline in his political alliance with Breteuil, which ended in mutual loathing.

Necker's dismissal provoked the storming of the Bastille on 14 July. With the concurrence of Louis XVI and Marie Antoinette, Charles and his family left France three days later, on 17 July, along with several other courtiers. These included the Duchess of Polignac, the queen's favourite. His flight was historically attributed to personal fears for his own safety. However recent research indicates that the King had approved his brother's departure in advance, seeing it as a means of ensuring that one close relative would be free to act as a spokesman for the monarchy, after Louis himself had been moved from Versailles to Paris.

== Life in exile ==
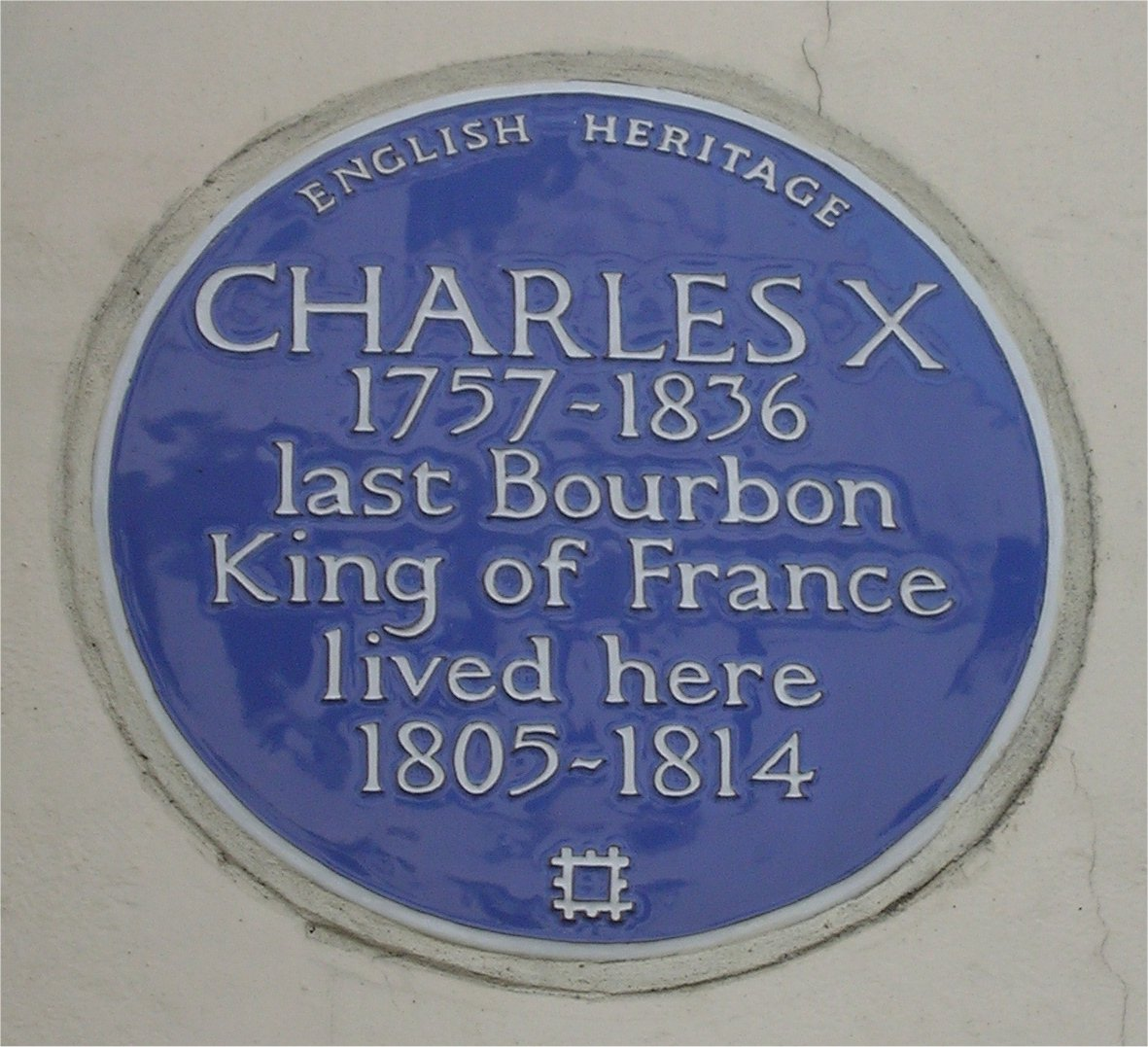
A Blue plaque at 72 South Audley Street, Mayfair, London, his home between 1805 and 1814

Charles and his family decided to seek refuge in Savoy, his wife's native country, where they were joined by some members of the Condé family. Meanwhile, in Paris, Louis XVI was struggling with the National Assembly, which was committed to radical reforms and had enacted the Constitution of 1791. In March 1791, the Assembly also enacted a regency bill that provided for the case of the king's premature death. While his heir Louis-Charles was still a minor, the Count of Provence, the Duke of Orléans or, if either was unavailable, someone chosen by election should become regent, completely passing over the rights of Charles who, in the royal lineage, stood between the Count of Provence and the Duke of Orléans.

Charles meanwhile left Turin (in Italy) and moved to Trier in Germany, where his uncle, Clemens Wenceslaus of Saxony, was the incumbent Archbishop-Elector. Charles prepared for a counter-revolutionary invasion of France, but a letter by Marie Antoinette postponed it until after the royal family had escaped from Paris and joined a concentration of regular troops under François Claude Amour, marquis de Bouillé at Montmédy.

After the attempted flight was stopped at Varennes, Charles moved on to Koblenz, where he, the recently escaped Count of Provence and the Princes of Condé jointly declared their intention to invade France. The Count of Provence was sending dispatches to various European sovereigns for assistance, while Charles set up a court-in-exile in the Electorate of Trier. On 25 August, the rulers of the Holy Roman Empire and Prussia issued the Declaration of Pillnitz, which called on other European powers to intervene in France.

On New Year's Day 1792, the National Assembly declared all emigrants traitors, repudiated their titles and confiscated their lands. This measure was followed by the suspension and eventually the abolition of the monarchy in September 1792. The royal family was imprisoned, and the former king and former queen were eventually executed in 1793. The young former dauphin, at ten-years-old, died of illnesses and severe neglect while imprisoned in 1795.

When the French Revolutionary Wars broke out in 1792, Charles escaped to Great Britain, where King George III gave him a generous allowance. Charles lived in Edinburgh and London with his mistress Louise de Polastron. His older brother, dubbed Louis XVIII after the death of his nephew in June 1795, relocated to Verona and then to Jelgava Palace, Mitau, where Charles' son Louis Antoine married Louis XVI's only surviving child, Marie Thérèse, on 10 June 1799. In 1802, Charles supported his brother with several thousand pounds. In 1807, Louis XVIII moved to the United Kingdom.

== Bourbon Restoration ==
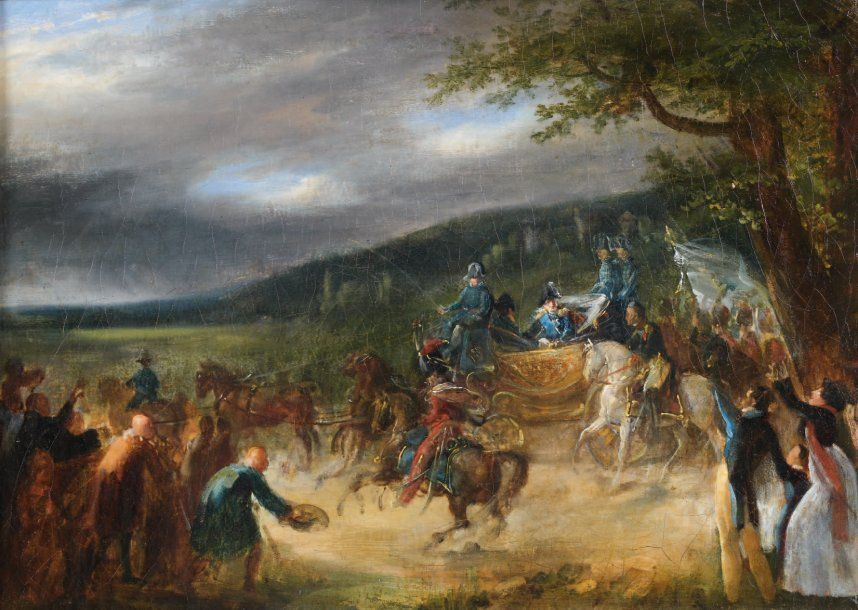
The Return of Charles X by Pauline Auzou

In January 1814, Charles covertly left his home in London to join the Coalition forces in southern France. Louis XVIII, by then reliant on a wheelchair, supplied Charles with letters patent creating him Lieutenant General of the Kingdom of France. On 31 March, the Allies captured Paris. A week later, Napoleon abdicated. The Senate declared the restoration of the Bourbon monarchy, with Louis XVIII as King of France. Charles (now heir-presumptive) arrived in the capital on 12 April and acted as Lieutenant General of the realm until Louis XVIII arrived from the United Kingdom. During his brief tenure as regent, Charles created an ultra-royalist secret police that reported directly back to him without Louis XVIII's knowledge. It operated for over five years.

Louis XVIII was greeted with great rejoicing from the Parisians and proceeded to occupy the Tuileries Palace. The Count of Artois lived in the Pavillon de Mars, and the Duke of Angoulême in the Pavillon de Flore, which overlooked the River Seine. The Duchess of Angoulême fainted upon arriving at the palace, as it brought back terrible memories of her family's incarceration there, and of the storming of the palace and the massacre of the Swiss Guards on 10 August 1792.

Following the advice of the occupying allied army, Louis XVIII promulgated a liberal constitution, the Charter of 1814, which provided for a bicameral legislature, an electorate of 90,000 men and freedom of religion. After the Hundred Days, Napoleon's brief return to power in 1815, the White Terror focused mainly on the purging of a civilian administration which had almost completely turned against the Bourbon monarchy. About 70,000 officials were dismissed from their positions. The remnants of the Napoleonic army were disbanded after the Battle of Waterloo and its senior officers cashiered. Marshal Ney was executed for treason, and Marshal Brune was murdered by a crowd. Approximately 6,000 individuals who had rallied to Napoleon were brought to trial. There were about 300 mob lynchings in southern France, notably in Marseille where a number of Napoleon's Mamluks preparing to return to Egypt, were massacred in their barracks.

== King's brother and heir presumptive ==
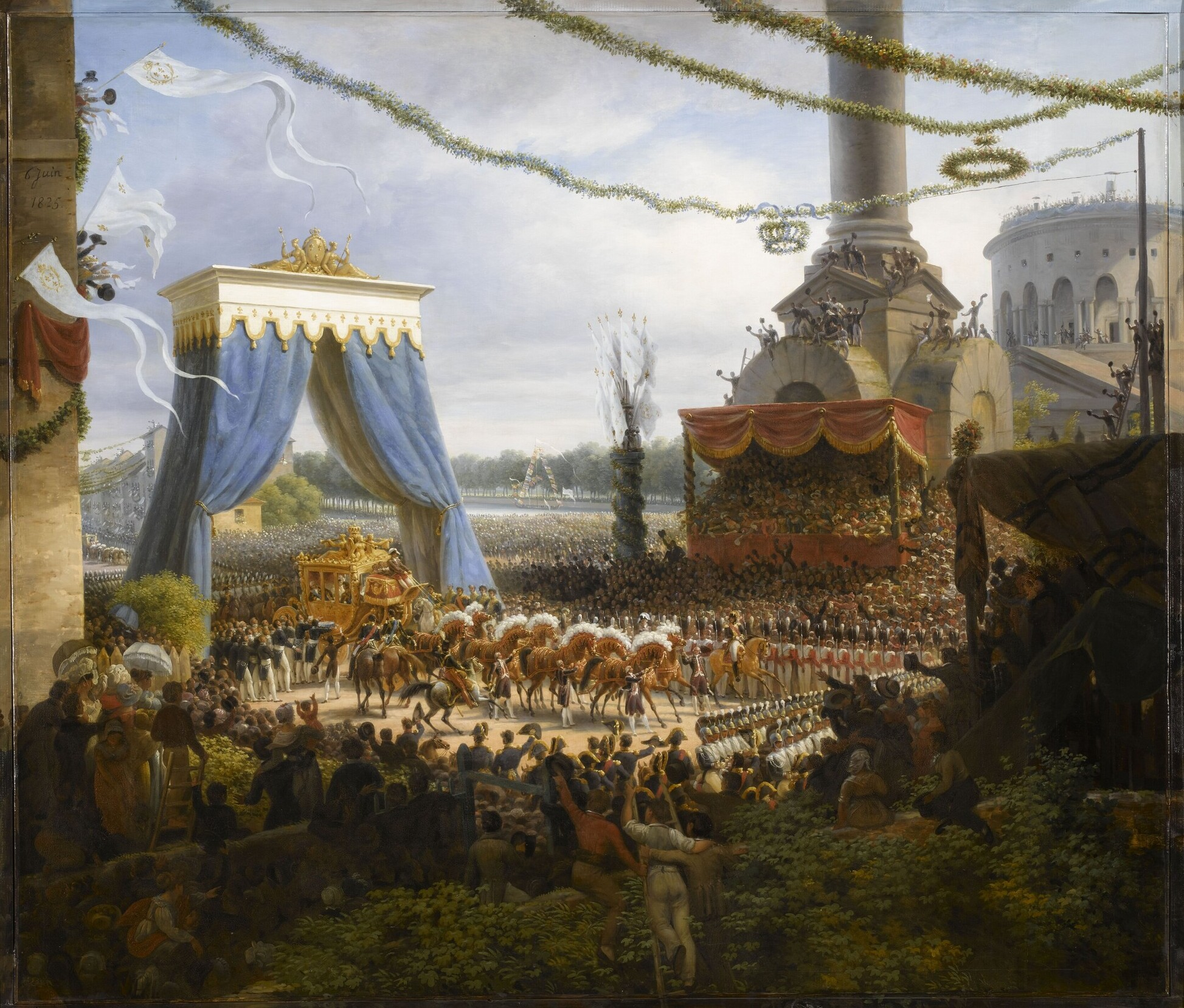
Entry of Charles X into Paris After His Coronation (Louis-François Lejeune, 1825)

While the king retained the liberal charter, Charles patronised members of the ultra-royalists in parliament, such as Jules de Polignac, the writer François-René de Chateaubriand and Jean-Baptiste de Villèle. On several occasions, Charles voiced his disapproval of his brother's liberal ministers and threatened to leave the country unless Louis XVIII dismissed them. Louis, in turn, feared that his brother's and heir presumptive's ultra-royalist tendencies would send the family into exile once more (which they eventually did).

On 14 February 1820, Charles's younger son, the Duke of Berry, was assassinated at the Paris Opera. This loss not only plunged the family into grief but also put the succession in jeopardy, as Charles's elder son, the Duke of Angoulême, was childless. The lack of male heirs in the Bourbon main line raised the prospect of the throne passing to the Duke of Orléans and his heirs, which horrified the more conservative ultras. Parliament debated the abolition of the Salic law, which excluded females from the succession and was long held inviolable. However, the Duke of Berry's widow, Caroline of Naples and Sicily, was found to be pregnant and on 29 September 1820 gave birth to a son, Henry, Duke of Bordeaux. His birth was hailed as "God-given", and the people of France purchased for him the Château de Chambord in celebration of his birth. As a result, his granduncle, Louis XVIII, added the title Count of Chambord, hence Henri, Count of Chambord, the name by which he is usually known.

== Reign ==
=== Ascension and coronation ===
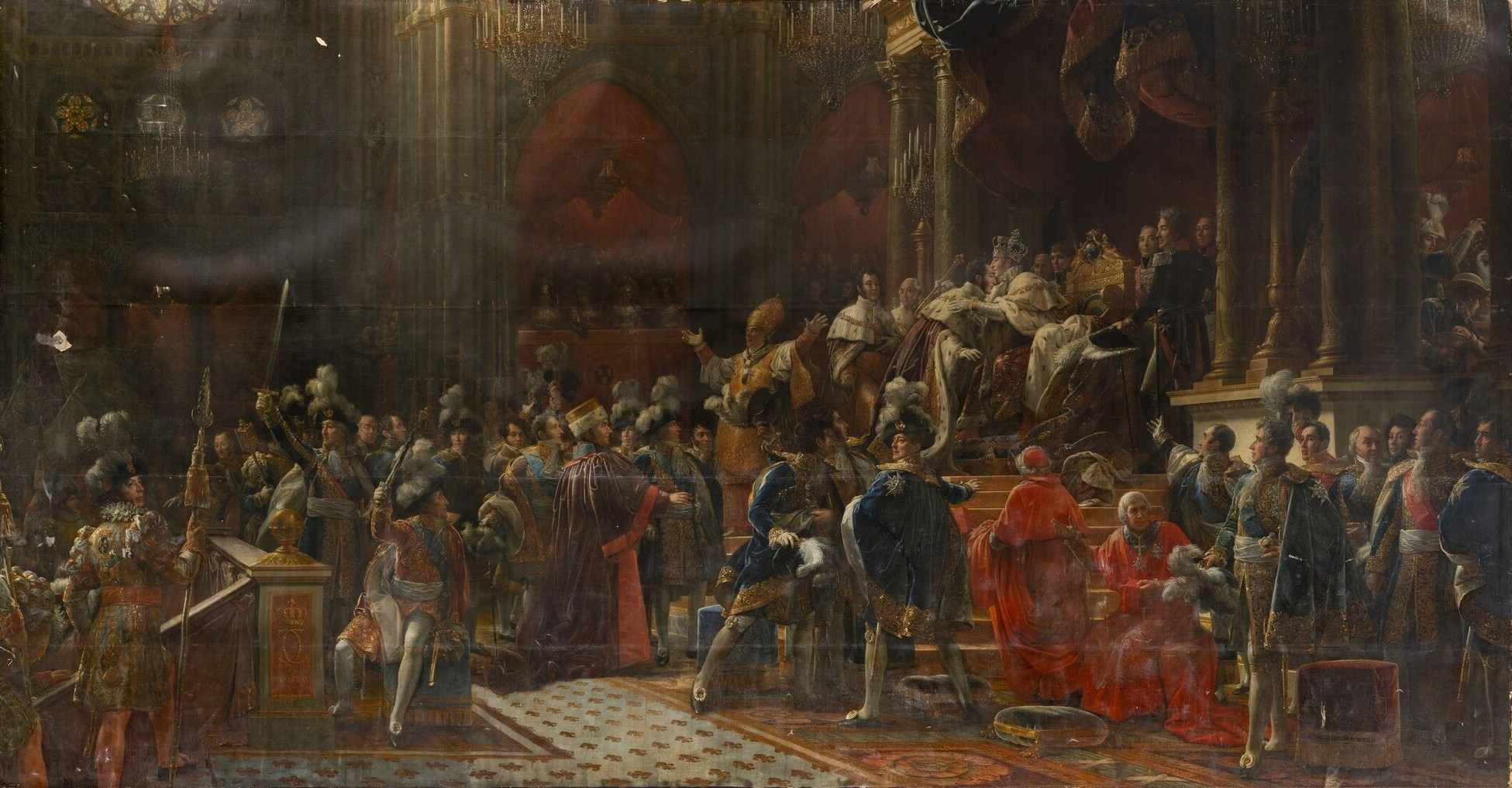
The Coronation of Charles X by François Gérard. Consecration of Charles X as King of France in the Cathedral of Reims

Charles' brother King Louis XVIII's health had been worsening since the beginning of 1824. Having both dry and wet gangrene in his legs and spine, he died on 16 September of that year, aged almost 69. Charles, by now aged 66, succeeded him to the throne as King Charles X. On 29 May 1825, King Charles was anointed at the cathedral of Reims, the traditional site of consecration of French kings; it had been unused since 1775, as Louis XVIII had forgone the ceremony to avoid controversy and because his health was too precarious. It was in the venerable cathedral of Notre-Dame at Paris that Napoleon had consecrated his revolutionary empire; but in ascending the throne of his ancestors, Charles reverted to the old place of coronation used by the kings of France from the early ages of the monarchy. The last coronation to be held there was the Coronation of Louis XVI in 1775.

Like the regime of the Restoration itself, the coronation was conceived as a compromise between the monarchical tradition and the Charter of 1814: it took up the main phases of traditional ceremonial such as the seven anointings or the oaths on the Gospels, all by associating with it the oath of fidelity taken by the King to the Charter of 1814 or the participation of the great princes in the ceremonial as assistants of the Archbishop of Reims.

A commission was charged with simplifying and modernizing the ceremony and making it compatible with the principles of the monarchy according to the Charter (deletion of the promises of struggle against heretics and infidels, of the twelve peers, of references to Hebrew royalty, etc.) – it lasted three and a half hours.

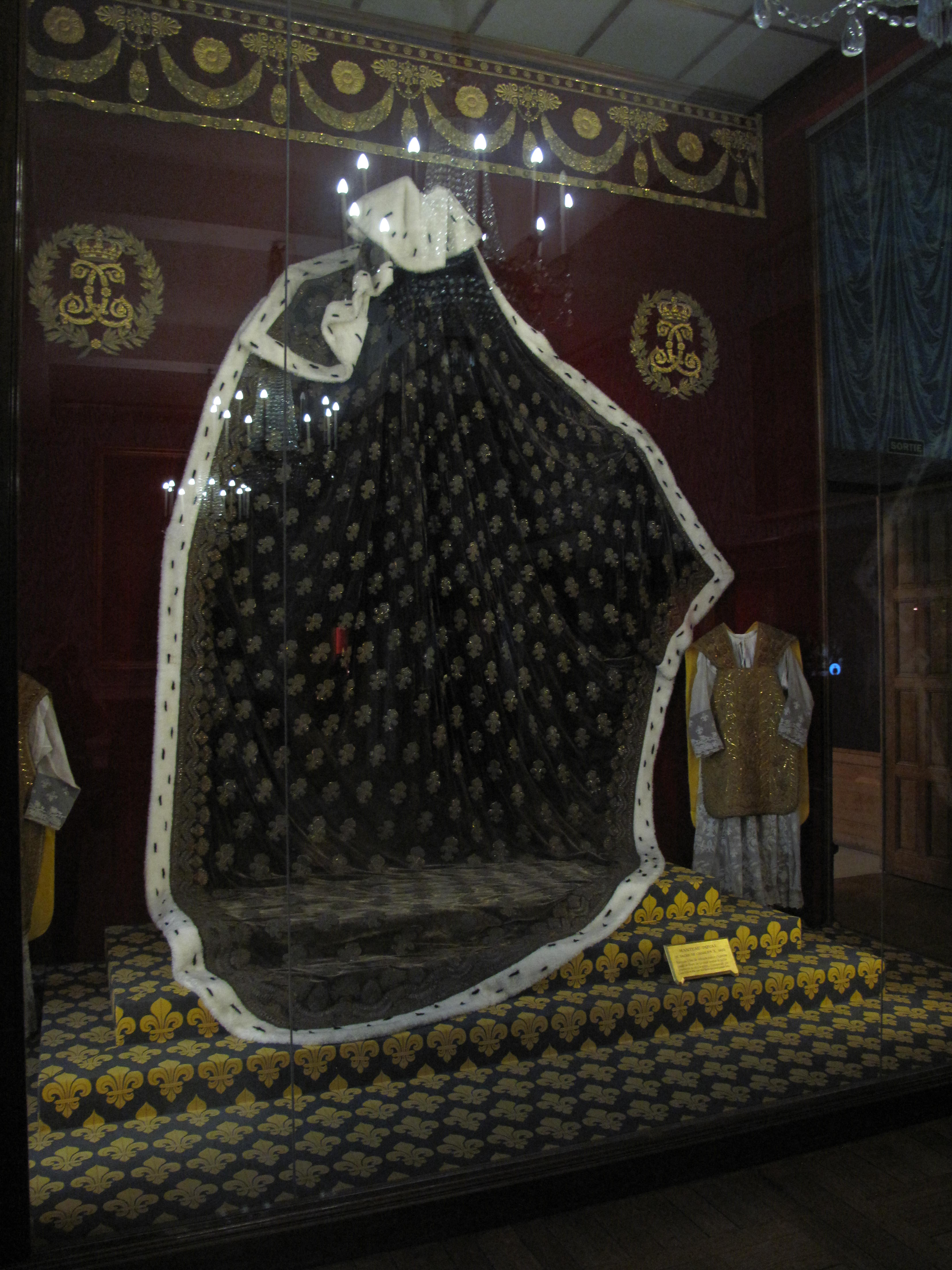
Coronation robe of King Charles X. Preserved in the palais du Tau in Reims (Marne, France).

The choice of the coronation was applauded by the royalists in favor of a constitutional and parliamentary monarchy and not only by those nostalgic for the ancien régime; the fact that the ceremony was modernized and adapted to new times encouraged Chateaubriand, a non-absolutist royalist and enthusiastic supporter of the Charter of 1814, to invite the king to be crowned. In the brochure The King is Dead! Long live the king! Chateaubriand explains that a coronation would have being the "link in the chain which united the oath of the new monarchy to the oath of the old monarchy"; it is continuity with the Ancien Régime more than its return that the royalists extol, Charles X having inherited the qualities of his ancestors: "pious like Saint Louis, affable, compassionate and vigilant like Louis XII, courteous like Francis I, frank as Henry IV".

The coronation showed that dynastic continuity went hand in hand with political continuity; for Chateaubriand: "The current constitution is only the rejuvenated text of the code of our old franchises". This coronation took several days: the 28 May, vespers ceremony; 29 May, ceremony of the coronation itself, chaired by the Archbishop of Reims, Jean-Baptiste de Latil, in the presence in particular of Chateaubriand, Lamartine, Victor Hugo, and a large audience; 30 May, award ceremony for the Knights of the Order of the Holy Spirit and finally, 31 May, the Royal touch of scrofula.

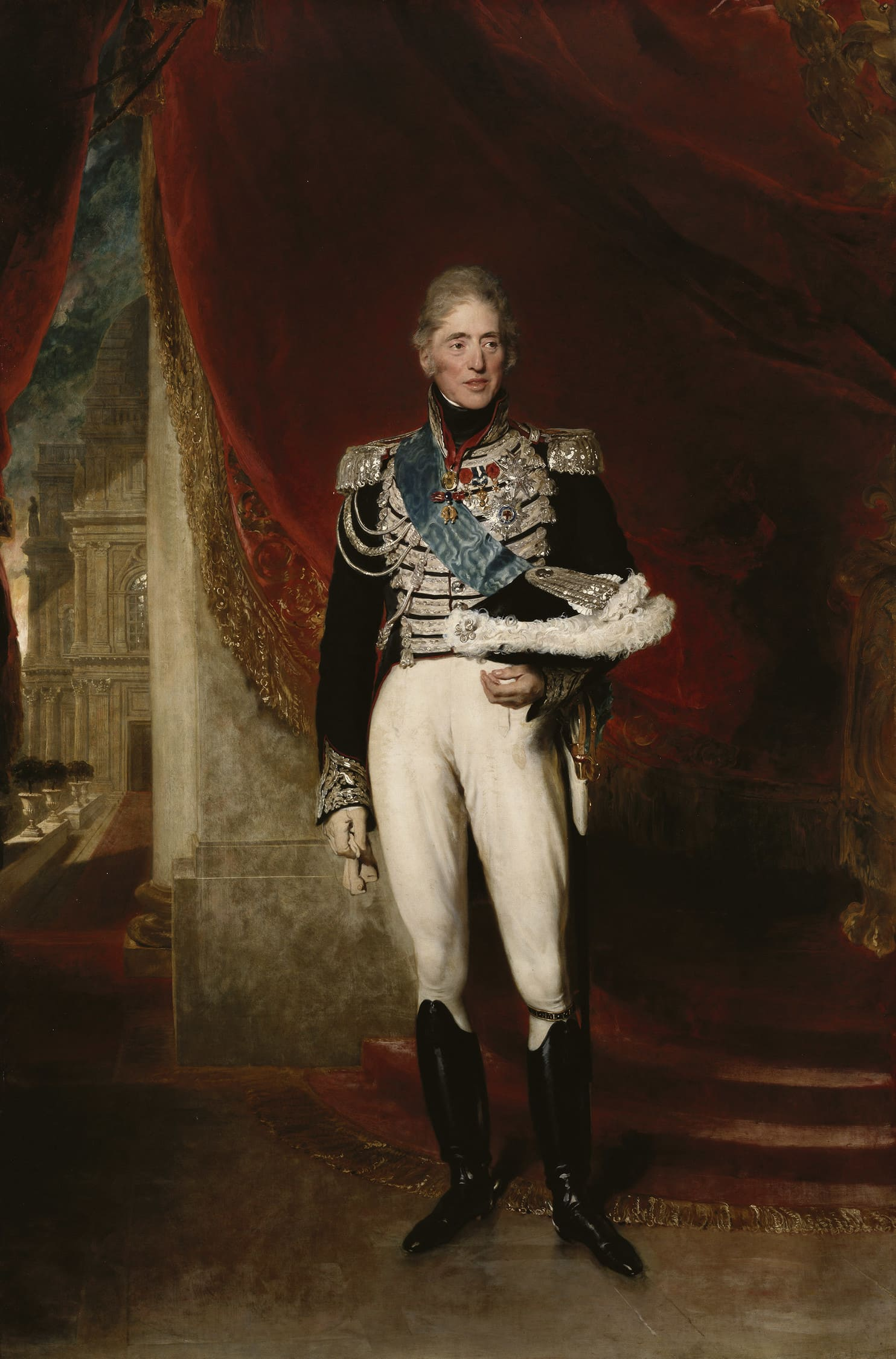
Portrait of Charles X by Thomas Lawrence 1825. Commissioned by the British king George IV it now hangs in Windsor Castle.

The coronation of Charles X therefore appeared to be a compromise between the tradition of the ancien régime and the political changes that had taken place since the Revolution. The coronation nevertheless had a limited influence on the population. It was Luigi Cherubini who composed the music for the Coronation Mass. For the occasion, the composer Gioachino Rossini composed the Opera Il Viaggio a Reims.

=== Domestic policies ===
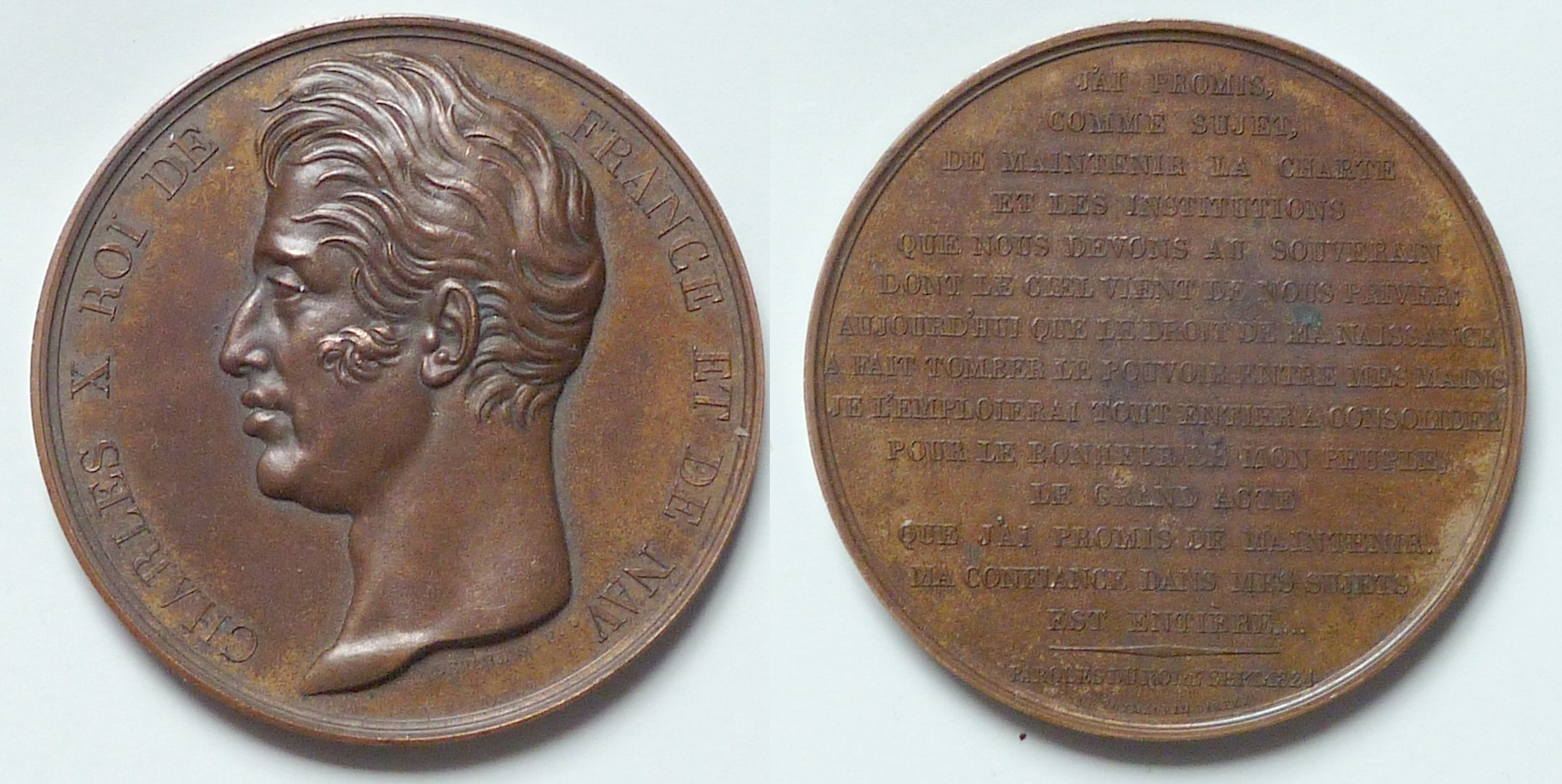
Medal engraved by Alexis-Joseph Depaulis with, on the reverse, Charles X's oath on the Constitutional Charter, 17 September 1824.

Like Napoleon and then Louis XVIII before him, Charles X resided mainly at the Tuileries Palace and, in summer, at the Château de Saint-Cloud, two buildings that no longer exist today. Occasionally he stayed at the Château de Compiègne and the Château de Fontainebleau, while the Palace of Versailles, where he was born, remained uninhabited. The reign of Charles X began with some liberal measures such as the abolition of press censorship, but the king renewed the term of Joseph de Villèlle, president of the council since 1822, and gave the reins of government to the ultraroyalists.

Charles X and his ministers in the late 1820s sought to maintain and strengthen the Bourbon monarchy by pursuing a reactionary, conservative agenda and attempting to solidify France's position within the framework of European conservative powers. As part of this strategy, they considered joining alliances with other monarchies that shared their ideological stance. Specifically, Charles X attempted to achieve political stability and reinforce his authority by aligning France with Russia, a major conservative power in Europe committed to upholding autocracy and suppressing revolutionary movements. This proposed alliance was intended to bolster Charles X's position against liberal opposition at home and to counteract the influence of liberalism and revolutionary sentiments that were spreading across Europe, particularly following the Napoleonic Wars and the liberal movements that emerged in Germany, Spain, Italy, and Belgium.

Charles got closer to the population by the trip he made to the north of France in September 1827, then to the east of France in September 1828. He was accompanied by his eldest son and heir-apparent, the Duke of Angoulême, now Dauphin of France. In his first act as king, Charles attempted to bring comity to the House of Bourbon by granting the style of Royal Highness to his cousins of the House of Orléans, a title denied by Louis XVIII because of the former Duke of Orléans' vote for the death of Louis XVI.

Charles gave his prime minister, Villèlle lists of laws to be ratified in each parliament. In April 1825, the government approved legislation originally proposed by Louis XVIII to pay an indemnity (the biens nationaux) to nobles whose estates had been confiscated during the Revolution. The law gave approximately 988 million francs worth of government bonds to those who had lost their lands, in exchange for their renunciation of their ownership. In the same month, the Anti-Sacrilege Act was passed. Charles's government attempted to re-establish male-only primogeniture for families paying over 300 francs in tax, but this was voted down in the Chamber of Deputies.

Charles's unpopularity in the mostly-liberal minded urban Paris became apparent in April 1827, when chaos ensued during the king's review of the National Guard in Paris after several guardsmen chanted "down with Villèle!" and "down with the Jesuits!". In retaliation, the National Guard was disbanded but, as its members were not disarmed, it remained a potential threat. After losing his parliamentary majority in a general election in November 1827, Charles dismissed Prime Minister Villèle on 5 January 1828 and appointed Jean-Baptise de Martignac, a man the king disliked and thought of only as provisional. On 5 August 1829, Charles dismissed Martignac and appointed Jules de Polignac, who, however, lost his majority in parliament at the end of August, when the Chateaubriand faction defected. Regardless, Polignac retained power and refused to recall the Chambers until March 1830.

=== Conquest of Algeria ===
On 31 January 1830, the Polignac government decided to send a military expedition, led by Louis-Auguste-Victor, Count de Ghaisnes de Bourmont to Algeria to end the threat of Algerian pirates to Mediterranean trade, hoping also to increase his government's popularity through a military victory. The pretext for the war was an outrage by the Viceroy of Algeria, who had struck the French consul with the handle of his fly swat in a rage over French failure to pay debts from Napoleon's invasion of Egypt. French troops occupied Algiers on 5 July.

=== July Revolution ===
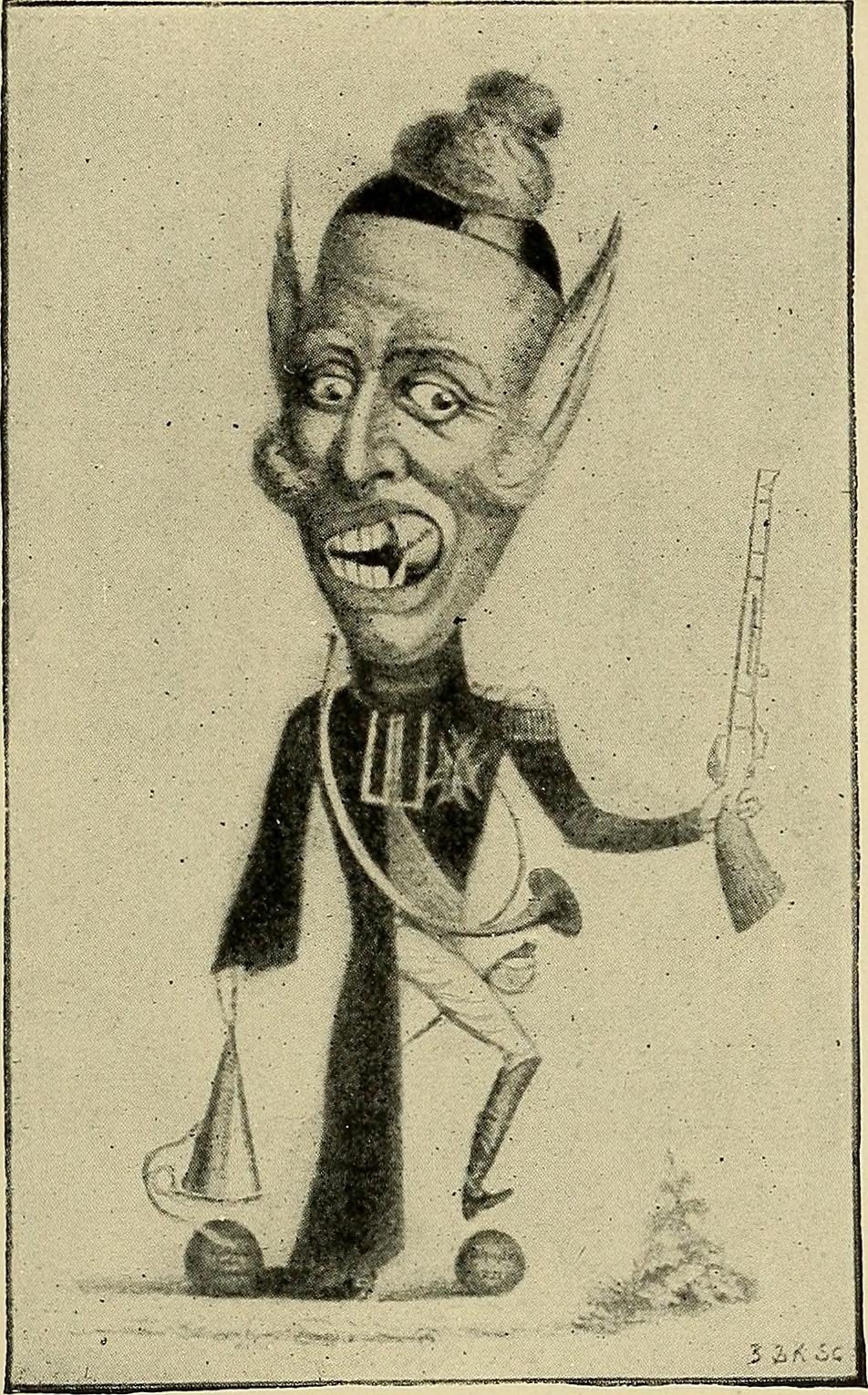
THE GREAT NUTCRACKER OF 25 JULY. In this caricature Charles X attempts to break a billiard ball marked "charter" with his teeth, but finds the nut too hard to crack.

The Chambers convened on 2 March 1830, but Charles's opening speech was greeted by negative reactions from many deputies. Some introduced a bill requiring the King's minister to obtain the support of the Chambers, and on 18 March, 221 deputies, a majority of 30, voted in favor. However, the King had already decided to hold general elections, and the chamber was suspended on 19 March.

The elections of 23 June did not produce a majority favorable to the government. On 6 July, the king and his ministers decided to suspend the constitution, as provided for in Article 14 of the Charter in case of emergency. On 25 July, at the royal residence in Saint-Cloud, Charles issued four ordinances that censored the press, dissolved the newly elected chamber, altered the electoral system, and called for elections under the new system in September.

The Ordinances were intended to quell the popular discontent but had the opposite effect. Journalists gathered in protest at the headquarters of the National daily, founded in January 1830 by Adolphe Thiers, Armand Carrel, and others. On Monday, 26 July, the government newspaper Le Moniteur Universel published the ordinances, and Thiers published a call to revolt signed by forty-three journalists: "The legal regime has been interrupted: that of force has begun... Obedience ceases to be a duty!" In the evening, crowds assembled in the gardens of the Palais-Royal, shouting "Down with the Bourbons!" and "Long live the Charter!". As the police closed off the gardens, the crowd regrouped in a nearby street where they shattered streetlamps.

The next morning of 27 July, police raided and shut down newspapers including Le National. When the protesters, who had re-entered the Palais-Royal gardens, heard of this, they threw stones at the soldiers, prompting them to shoot. By evening, the city was in chaos and shops were looted. On 28 July, the rioters began to erect barricades in the streets. Marshal Marmont, who had been called in the day before to remedy the situation, took the offensive, but some of his men defected to the rioters, and by afternoon he had to retreat to the Tuileries Palace.

The members of the Chamber of Deputies sent a five-man delegation to Marmont, urging him to advise the king to assuage the protesters by revoking the four Ordinances. On Marmont's request, the prime minister applied to the king, but Charles refused all compromise and dismissed his ministers that afternoon, realizing the precariousness of the situation. That evening, the members of the Chamber assembled at Jacques Laffitte's house and elected Louis Philippe d'Orléans to take the throne from King Charles, proclaiming their decision on posters throughout the city. By the end of the day, the authority of Charles' government had evaporated.

A few minutes after midnight on 31 July, warned by General Gresseau that Parisians were planning to attack the Saint-Cloud residence, Charles X decided to seek refuge in Versailles with his family and the court, with the exception of the Duke of Angoulême, who stayed behind with the troops, and the Duchess of Angoulême, who was taking the waters at Vichy. Meanwhile, in Paris, Louis Philippe assumed the post of Lieutenant General of the Kingdom. Charles' road to Versailles was filled with disorganized troops and deserters. The Marquis de Vérac, governor of the Palace of Versailles, came to meet the king before the royal cortège entered the town, to tell him that the palace was not safe, as the Versailles national guards wearing the revolutionary tricolor were occupying the Place d'Armes. Charles then set out for the Trianon at five in the morning. Later that day, after the arrival of the Duke of Angoulême from Saint-Cloud with his troops, Charles ordered a departure for Rambouillet, where they arrived shortly before midnight. On the morning of 1 August, the Duchess of Angoulême, who had rushed from Vichy after learning of events, arrived at Rambouillet.

The following day, 2 August, King Charles X abdicated, bypassing his son the Dauphin in favor of his grandson Henry, Duke of Bordeaux, who was not yet ten years old. At first, the Duke of Angoulême (the Dauphin) refused to countersign the document renouncing his rights to the throne of France. According to the Duchess of Maillé, "there was a strong altercation between the father and the son. We could hear their voices in the next room." Finally, after twenty minutes, the Duke of Angoulême reluctantly countersigned his father's declaration:

"My cousin, I am too deeply pained by the ills that afflict or could threaten my people, not to seek means of avoiding them. Therefore, I have made the resolution to abdicate the crown in favor of my grandson, the Duke of Bordeaux. The Dauphin, who shares my feelings, also renounces his rights in favor of his nephew. It will thus fall to you, in your capacity as Lieutenant General of the Kingdom, to proclaim the accession of Henri V to the throne. Furthermore, you will take all pertinent measures to regulate the forms of government during the new king's minority. Here, I limit myself to stating these arrangements, as a means of avoiding further evils. You will communicate my intentions to the diplomatic corps, and you will let me know as soon as possible the proclamation by which my grandson will be recognized as king under the name of Henri V." (Note: Charles X's abdication (in French): "Mon cousin, je suis trop profondément peiné des maux qui affligent ou qui pourraient menacer mes peuples pour n'avoir pas cherché un moyen de les prévenir. J'ai donc pris la résolution d'abdiquer la couronne en faveur de mon petit-fils, le duc de Bordeaux. Le dauphin, qui partage mes sentiments, renonce aussi à ses droits en faveur de son neveu. Vous aurez donc, en votre qualité de lieutenant général du royaume, à faire proclamer l'avènement de Henri V à la couronne. Vous prendrez d'ailleurs toutes les mesures qui vous concernent pour régler les formes du gouvernement pendant la minorité du nouveau roi. Ici, je me borne à faire connaître ces dispositions : c'est un moyen d'éviter encore bien des maux. Vous communiquerez mes intentions au corps diplomatique, et vous me ferez connaître le plus tôt possible la proclamation par laquelle mon petit-fils sera reconnu roi sous le nom de Henri V.")

Louis Philippe ignored the document and on 9 August had himself proclaimed King of the French by the members of the Chamber.

== Second exile and death ==
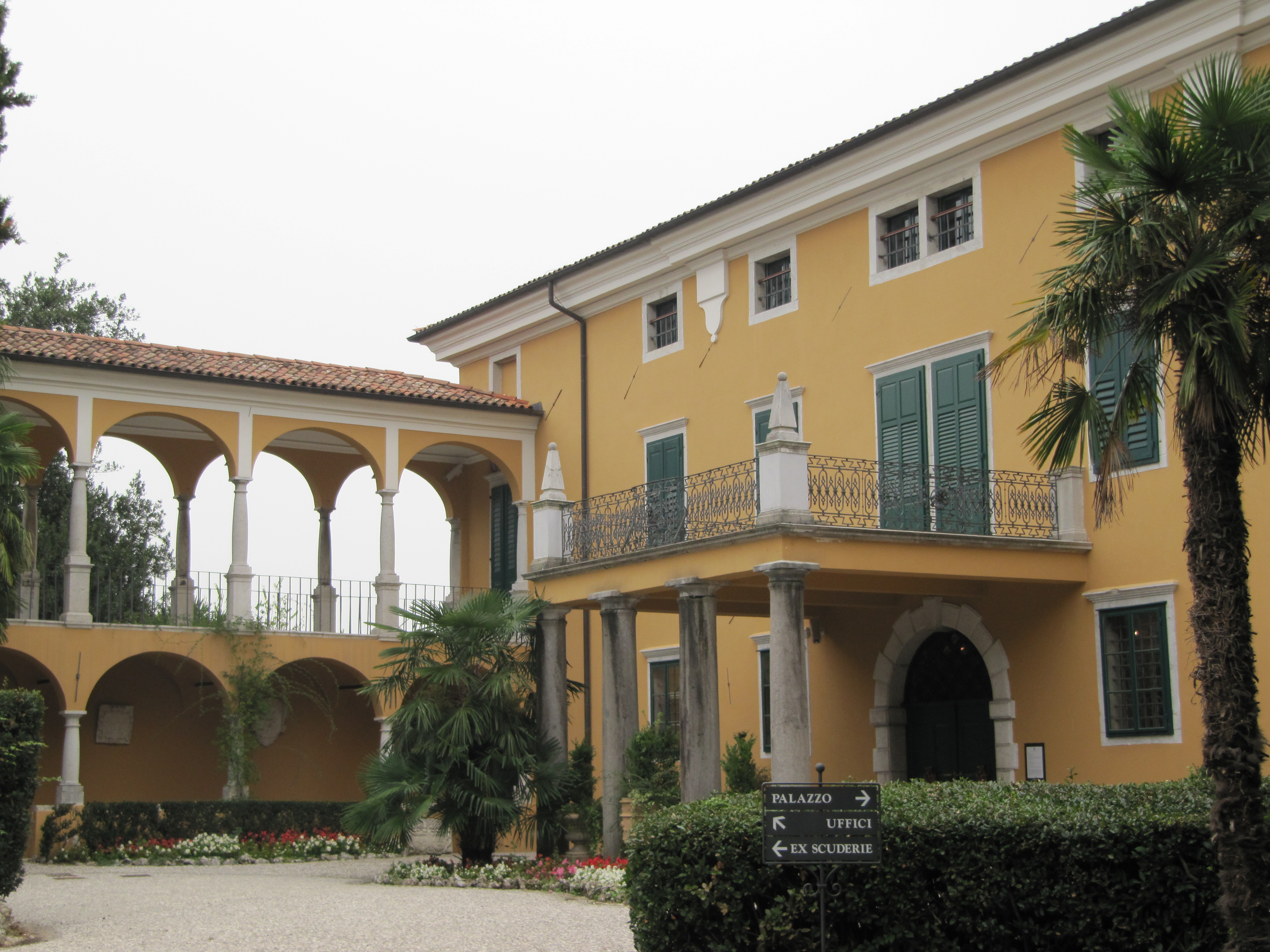
The Coronini Cronberg Palace in Gorizia, where Charles X spent the last month of his life

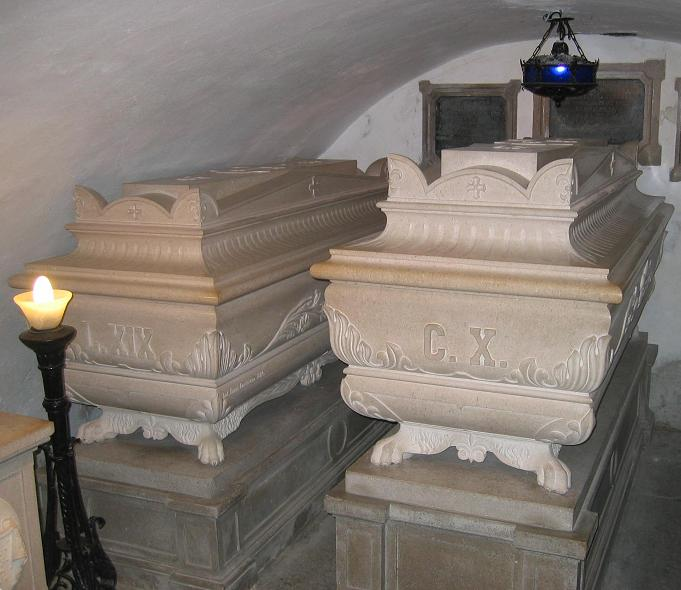
Tombs of Charles X and his son Louis at the Kostanjevica Monastery in the Slovenian town of Nova Gorica

When it became apparent that a mob 14,000 strong was preparing to attack, the royal family left Rambouillet and, on 16 August, embarked for the United Kingdom on packet steamers provided by Louis Philippe. Informed by the British prime minister, the Duke of Wellington, that they needed to arrive in Britain as private citizens, all family members adopted pseudonyms; Charles X styled himself "Count of Ponthieu". The Bourbons were greeted coldly by the British, who upon their arrival mockingly waved the newly adopted tricolour flags at them. Charles X was quickly followed to Britain by his creditors, who had lent him vast sums during his first exile and were yet to be repaid in full. However, the family was able to use money Charles's wife had deposited in London. The Bourbons were allowed to reside in Lulworth Castle in Dorset, but quickly moved to Holyrood Palace in Edinburgh, near the Duchess of Berry at Regent Terrace.

Charles' relationship with his daughter-in-law proved uneasy, as the Duchess declared herself regent for her son Henry, Duke of Bordeaux, who was now the legitimist pretender to the French throne. Charles at first denied her this role, but in December agreed to support her claim once she had landed in France. In 1831, the Duchess made her way from Britain by way of the Netherlands, Prussia and Austria to her family in Naples. Having gained little support, she arrived in Marseille in April 1832, and made her way to the Vendée, where she tried to instigate an uprising against the new regime. There she was imprisoned, much to the embarrassment of her father-in-law Charles. He was further dismayed when after her release the Duchess married the Count of Lucchesi Palli, a minor Neapolitan noble. In response to this morganatic match, Charles banned her from seeing her children.

At the invitation of Emperor Francis I of Austria, the Bourbons moved to Prague in winter 1832/33 and were given lodging at the Hradschin Palace. In September 1833, Bourbon legitimists gathered in Prague to celebrate the Duke of Bordeaux's thirteenth birthday. They expected grand celebrations, but Charles X merely proclaimed his grandson's majority. On the same day, after much cajoling by Chateaubriand, Charles agreed to a meeting with his daughter-in-law, which took place in Leoben on 13 October 1833. The children of the Duchess refused to meet her after they learned of her second marriage. Charles refused the Duchess' demands, but after protests from his other daughter-in-law, the Duchess of Angoulême, he acquiesced. In the summer of 1834, he again allowed the Duchess of Berry to see her children.

Upon the death of the Austrian emperor Francis in March 1835, the Bourbons left Prague Castle, as the new emperor Ferdinand wished to use it for coronation ceremonies. The Bourbons moved initially to Teplitz. Then, as Ferdinand continued his use of Prague Castle, Kirchberg Castle was purchased for them. Moving there was postponed due to an outbreak of cholera in the locality. In the meantime, Charles left for the warmer climate on Austria's Mediterranean coast in October 1835. Upon his arrival at Görz (Gorizia) in the Kingdom of Illyria, he caught cholera and died on 6 November 1836. The townspeople draped their windows in black mourning. Charles was interred in the Church of the Annunciation of Our Lady, in the Franciscan Kostanjevica Monastery (now in Nova Gorica, Slovenia), where his remains lie in a crypt with those of his family. He is the only King of France to be buried outside the country. A movement reportedly began in 2016 advocating for Charles X's remains to be buried along with other French monarchs in the Basilica of St Denis, although Louis Alphonse, current head of the House of Bourbon, stated in 2017 that he wished the remains of his ancestors to lie undisturbed.

== Legacy ==
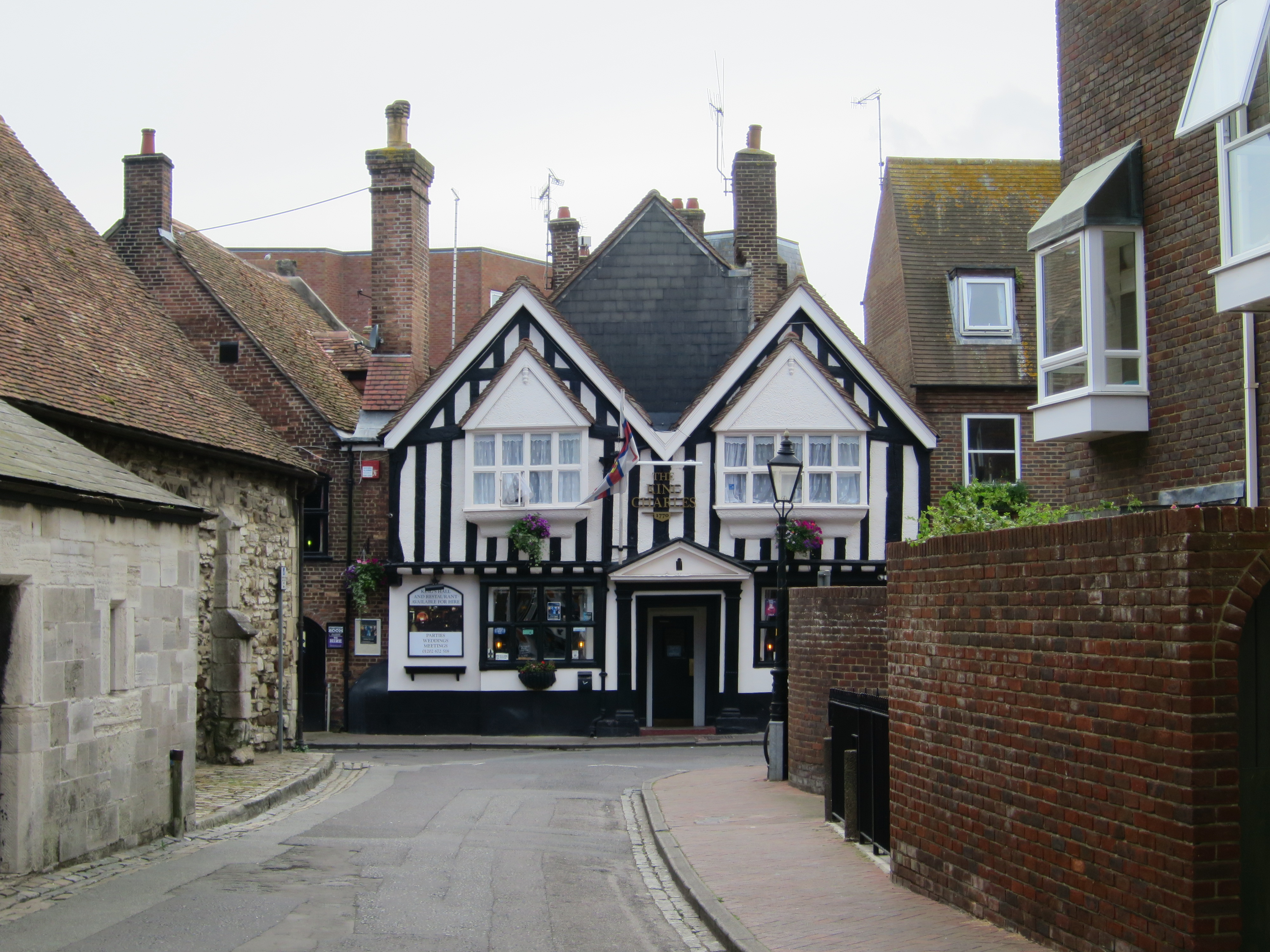
Kinges Halle, Poole

The King Charles Pub in Poole was renamed after Charles in 1830.

== Honours ==
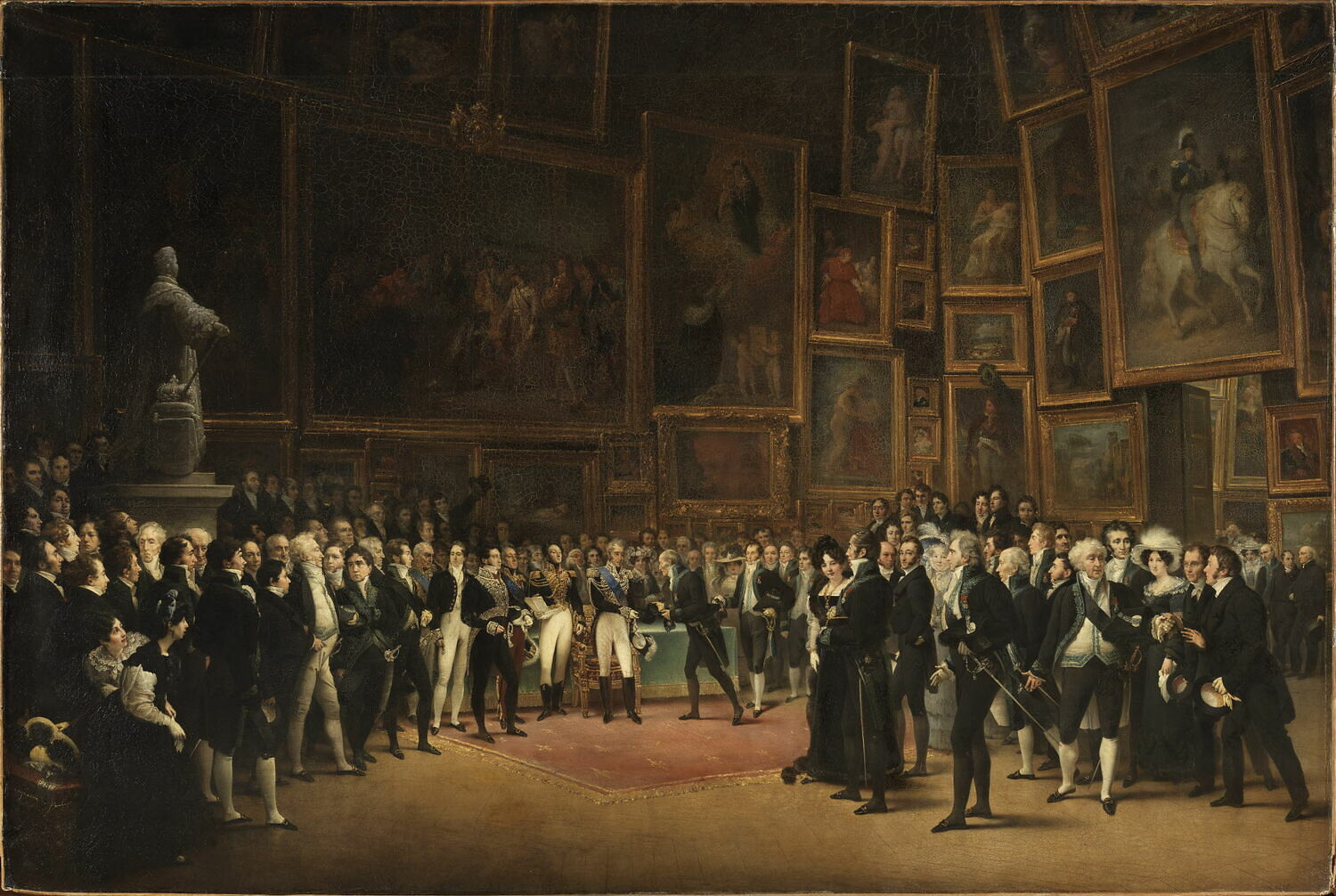
Charles X Distributing Awards to Artists by François Joseph Heim, 1827.

- Kingdom of France:
  - Knight of the Order of the Holy Spirit, 1 January 1771
  - Grand Cross of the Legion of Honour, 3 July 1816
  - Grand Cross of the Military Order of St. Louis, 10 July 1816
  - Grand Master and Knight of the Order of St. Michael
  - Grand Master and Grand Cross of the Order of St. Lazarus
  - Décoration de la Fidélité
  - Decoration of the Lily
- Austrian Empire: Grand Cross of the Order of St. Stephen, 1825
- Denmark: Knight of the Order of the Elephant, 2 October 1824
- Netherlands: Grand Cross of the Military William Order, 13 May 1825
- Kingdom of Prussia: Knight of the Order of the Black Eagle, 4 October 1824
- Russian Empire:
  - Knight of the Order of St. Andrew, June 1815
  - Knight of the Order of St. Alexander Nevsky, June 1815
- Kingdom of Saxony: Knight of the Order of the Rue Crown, 1827
- Spain: Knight of the Order of the Golden Fleece, 6 October 1761
- Two Sicilies:
  - Knight of the Order of St. Januarius
  - Grand Cross of the Order of St. Ferdinand and Merit
- United Kingdom of Great Britain and Ireland: Stranger Knight of the Order of the Garter, 9 March 1825

== Ancestry ==
Ancestors of Charles X of France

8. Louis, Duke of Burgundy
4. Louis XV of France
9. Marie Adélaïde of Savoy
2. Louis, Dauphin of France
10. Stanisław I of Poland
5. Maria of Poland
11. Katarzyna Opalińska
1. Charles X of France
12. Augustus II of Poland
6. Augustus III of Poland
13. Christiane Eberhardine of Bayreuth
3. Maria Josepha of Saxony
14. Joseph I, Holy Roman Emperor
7. Maria Josepha of Austria
15. Wilhelmine Amalia of Brunswick

== Marriage and issue ==
Charles X married Princess Maria Teresa of Savoy, the daughter of King Victor Amadeus III of Sardinia and Maria Antonietta of Spain, on 16 November 1773. The couple had four children – two sons and two daughters – but the daughters did not survive childhood. Only the oldest son survived his father. The children were:

1. Louis Antoine, Duke of Angoulême (6 August 1775 – 3 June 1844), sometimes called King Louis XIX. Married first cousin Marie Thérèse of France, no issue.
2. Sophie, Mademoiselle d'Artois (5 August 1776 – 5 December 1783), died in childhood.
3. Charles Ferdinand, Duke of Berry (24 January 1778 – 13 February 1820), married Marie-Caroline de Bourbon-Sicile, had issue.
4. Marie Thérèse, Mademoiselle d'Angoulême (6 January 1783 – 22 June 1783), died in childhood.

== In fiction and film ==
The Count of Artois is portrayed by Al Weaver in Sofia Coppola's motion picture Marie Antoinette.

The Count of Artois is also portrayed by Max Libert in the 2024 miniseries Franklin.

== Notes ==
Charles X of France House of Bourbon Cadet branch of the Capetian dynasty Born: 9 October 1757 Died: 6 November 1836
Regnal titles
Preceded by Louis XVIII	King of France; 16 September 1824 – 2 August 1830	Vacant July Revolution Title next held by Louis Philippe I as King of the French
Titles in pretence
Loss of title	— TITULAR — King of France; 2 August 1830 – 6 November 1836; Reason for succession failure: July Revolution	Succeeded by Louis XIX
