= Coronation of Charles X of France =

1825 coronation in France

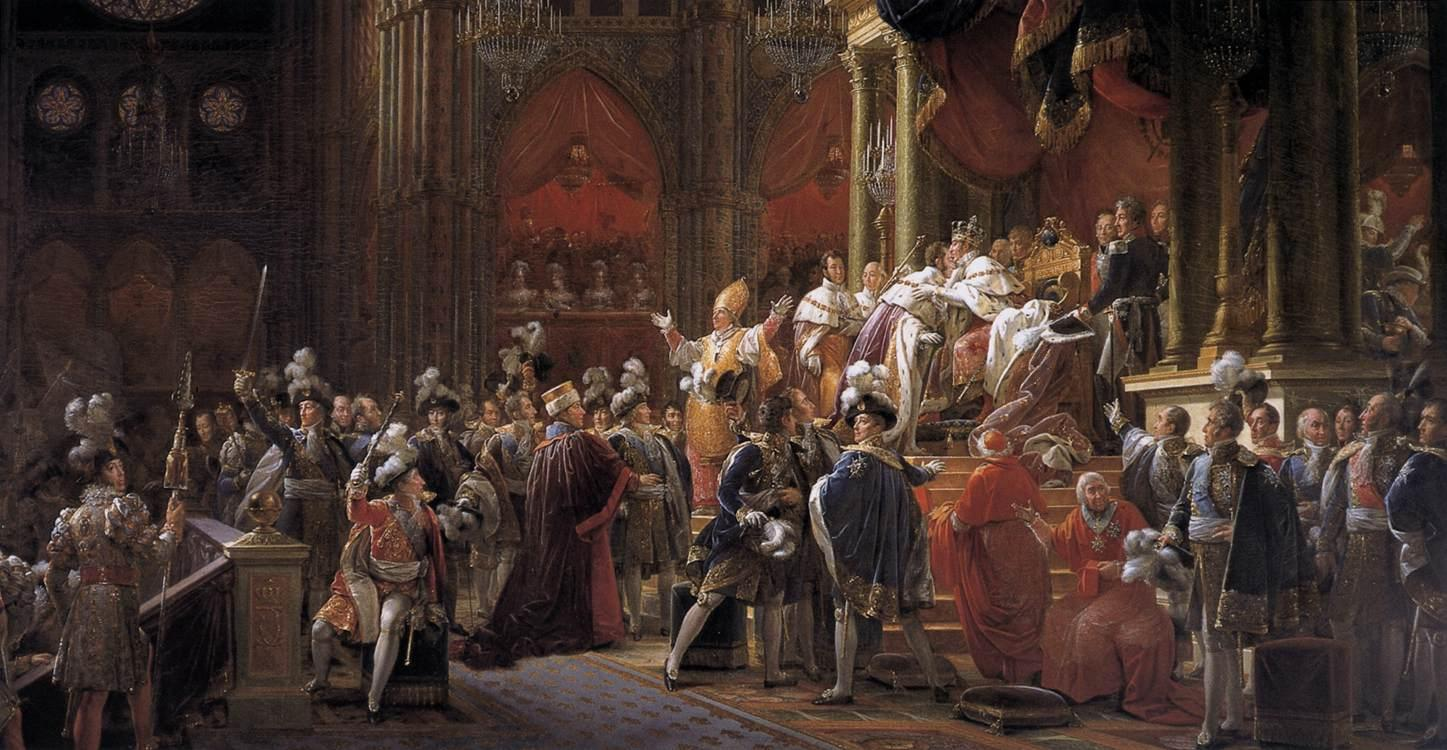
- The Coronation of Charles X by François Gérard (1827)
- Date: 29 May 1825; 201 years ago
- Location: Reims Cathedral, Reims, France
- Participants: Charles X; Cardinal Jean-Baptiste de Latil, Archbishop of Reims

The coronation of Charles X took place on 29 May 1825 in Reims, where he was crowned King of France and Navarre. The ceremony was held at the Cathedral of Notre-Dame de Reims in Reims, the traditional site for the coronations of the Kings of France. It was the first coronation since Louis XVI's in 1775, and marked the final coronation of a French monarch, as Louis Philippe I and Napoleon III were only proclaimed monarch.

== Background ==
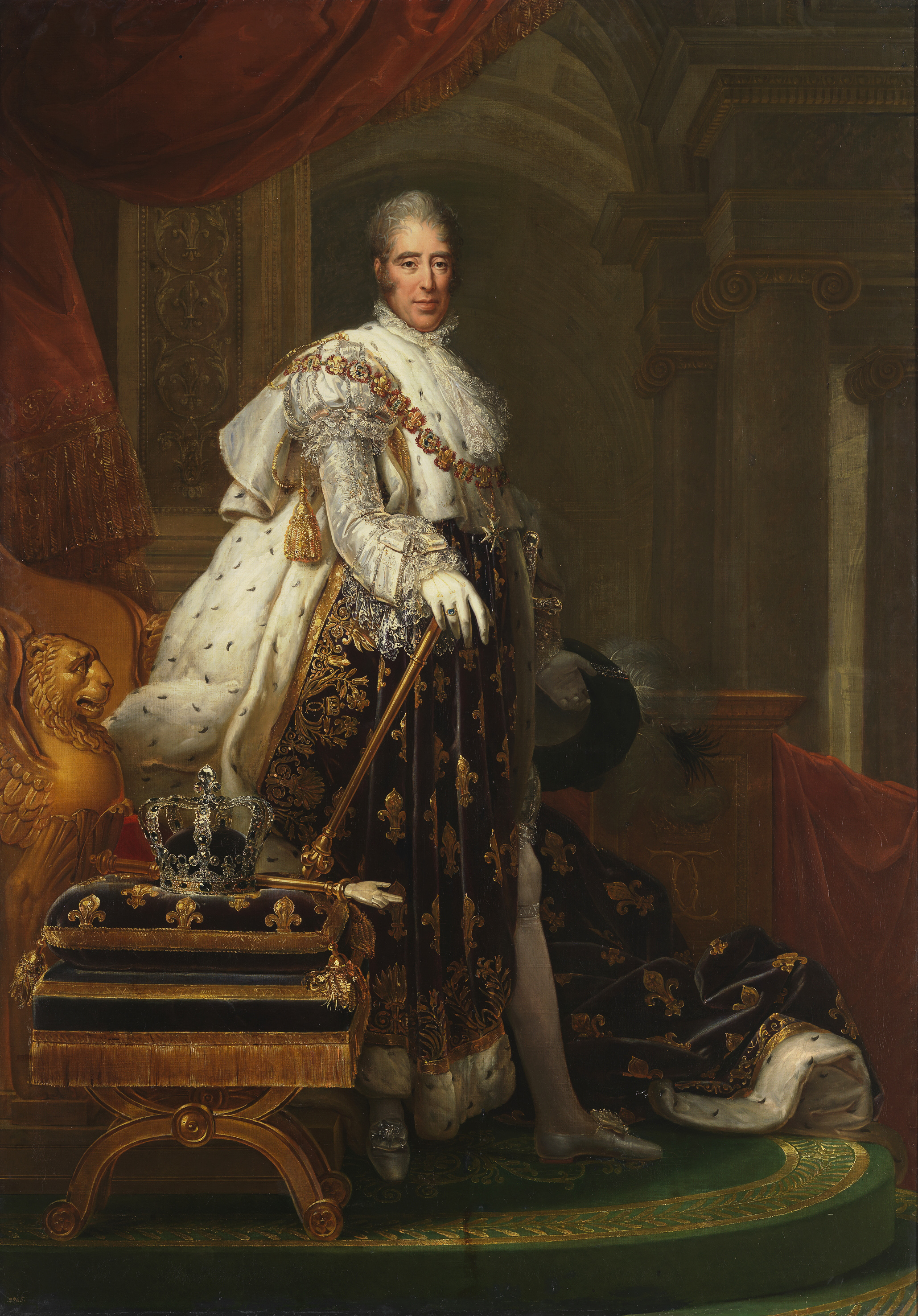
Coronation Portrait of Charles X (François Gérard, 1825)

Following the storming of the Bastille, Charles, Count of Artois, left France with his family, and subsequently spent many years in exile. During the later years of the Napoleonic Wars he settled in Britain, returning to France when the Bourbons were restored in 1814. Charles’ elder brother became Louis XVIII, and as the King was childless, Charles was his heir presumptive. Charles emerged as the leader of the Ultra-royalists, a conservative political grouping which rejected the changes of the French Revolution. Louis XVIII never had a coronation; plans to hold one kept falling through due to various circumstances, and ultimately were postponed indefinitely due to the King's poor physical health. He therefore reigned for ten years without any formal religious ceremony. The country was occupied by Allied forces until an agreement was reached at the Congress of Aix-la-Chapelle.

As the King's health declined, it was clear that Charles was likely to succeed him. While his eldest son Louis Antoine, Duke of Angoulême, had no children, his younger son Charles Ferdinand, Duke of Berry, who had been assassinated, had been survived by his pregnant wife who gave birth to a son, Henri, in September 1820. Henri was therefore heir to the throne after the childless Duke of Angoulême, apparently securing the succession for at least another generation. Louis XVIII died in September 1824 and the Count of Artois succeeded him as Charles X. In a speech from the throne on 22 December 1824, Charles made clear his intention to be crowned in the tradition of the ancien régime. While the 1804 coronation of Napoleon had taken place at Notre-Dame de Paris, the new king selected the ancient site of Reims Cathedral.

== Ceremony ==
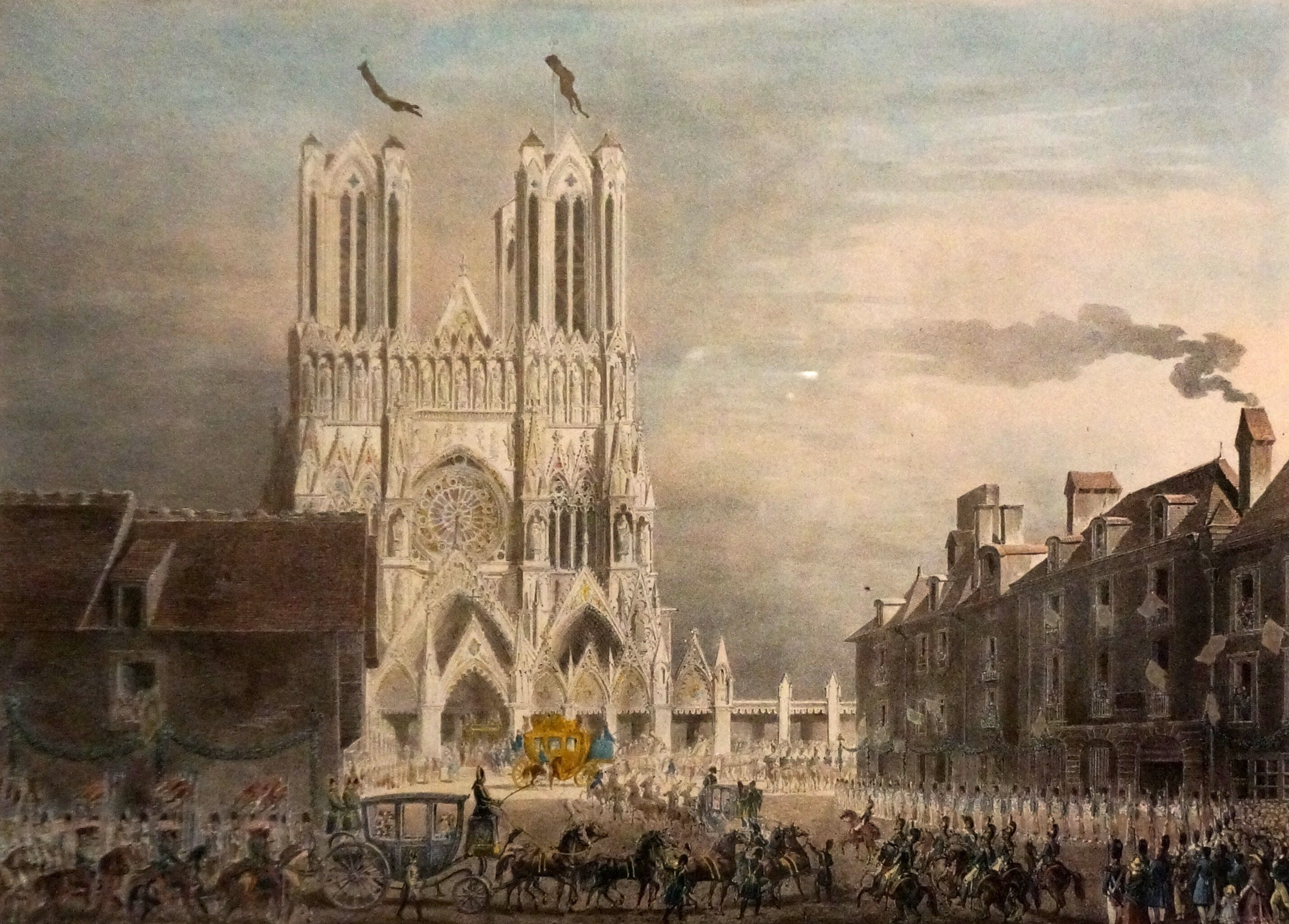
View of the Reims Cathedral during the coronation

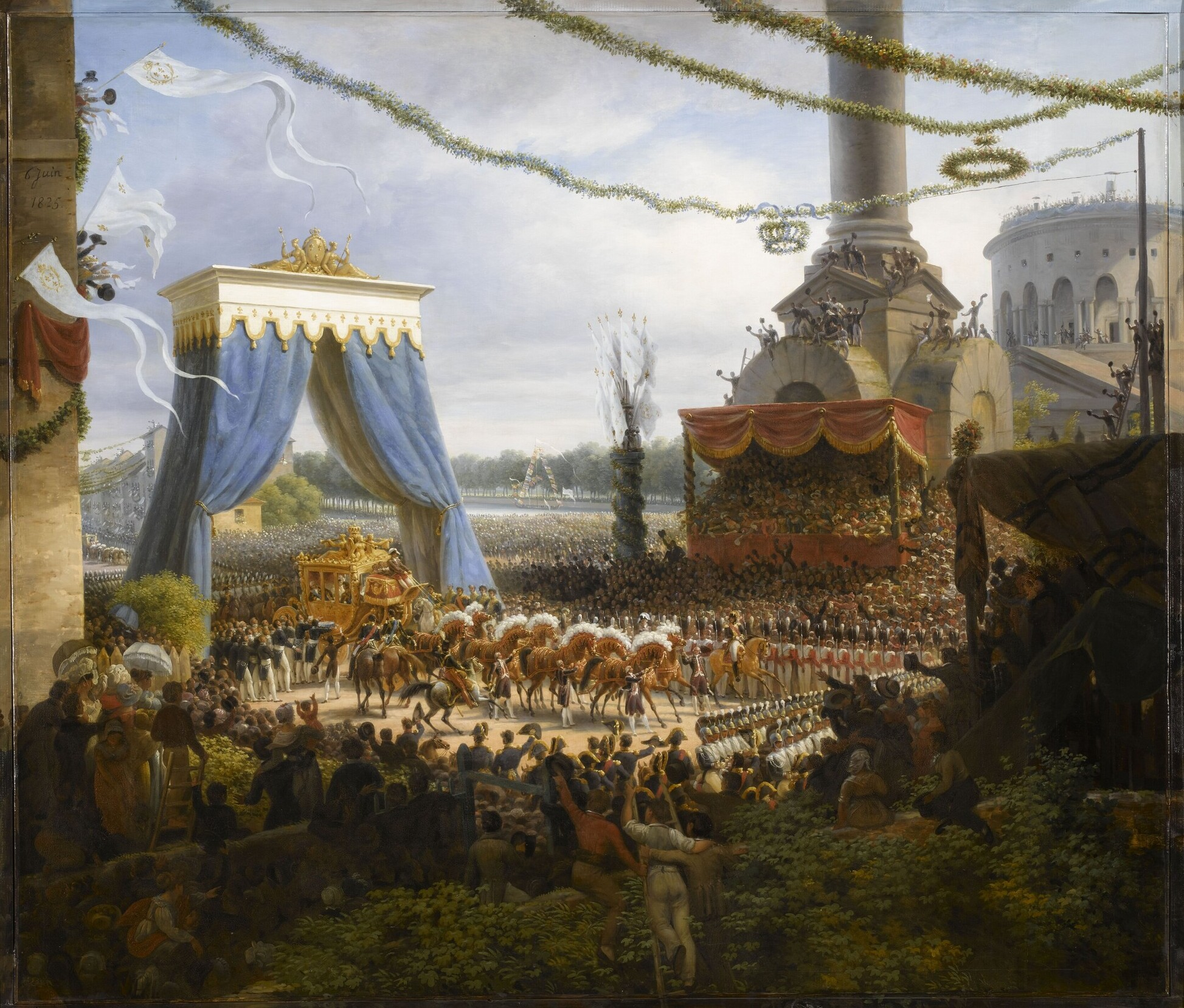
Entry of Charles X into Paris After His Coronation (Louis-François Lejeune, 1825)

The tradition of crowning French monarchs in Reims stretched back to the 9th century, as Clovis I, the first French monarch to become Christian (largely due to his wife, Saint Clotilde), had been baptised there. In 1825, the event consisted of four stages: the King's journey from Paris to Reims, the ceremonies in the city, his return journey to Paris, and his entry into the city, accompanied by various events in the capital. On 24 May 1825, the King departed Paris and traveled to Compiègne, where he stayed for three days. He then proceeded to Reims via Soissons. Extensive preparations had been made in Reims, with Charles X contributing a significant sum from the royal treasury, including funding the remodelling of the Palace of Tau, where he stayed. The 1814 gold coach designed by Charles Percier for Louis XVIII's unrealised coronation was used.

Large crowds gathered in Reims for the event. The Holy Ampulla, which had been used for over six hundred years, was destroyed by Revolutionaries in 1793. A new ampulla was designed by Louis Lafitte for the ceremony. A special Mass had been commissioned by the King from the Italian composer Luigi Cherubini. The ceremony was performed by Jean-Baptiste de Latil, the Archbishop of Reims. In a new innovation, four Napoleonic Marshals of France presented the King with the symbols of royal authority. In his oath, Charles X swore to uphold the Charter of 1814, which had established a constitutional monarchy rather than an absolute one. Nonetheless, the overall atmosphere was one of nostalgia for the pre-Revolution era, with pride of place given to the nobility and clergy.

The ceremony attracted visitors from across Europe. Notable French figures in attendance included the royalist writers François-René de Chateaubriand, Victor Hugo, and Charles Nodier. King Charles X returned to Compiègne on 1 June, where he rested for a few days before entering Paris on 6 June. He arrived in the city through the Villette Gate, a scene later depicted in a painting by Louis-François Lejeune.

== Aftermath ==
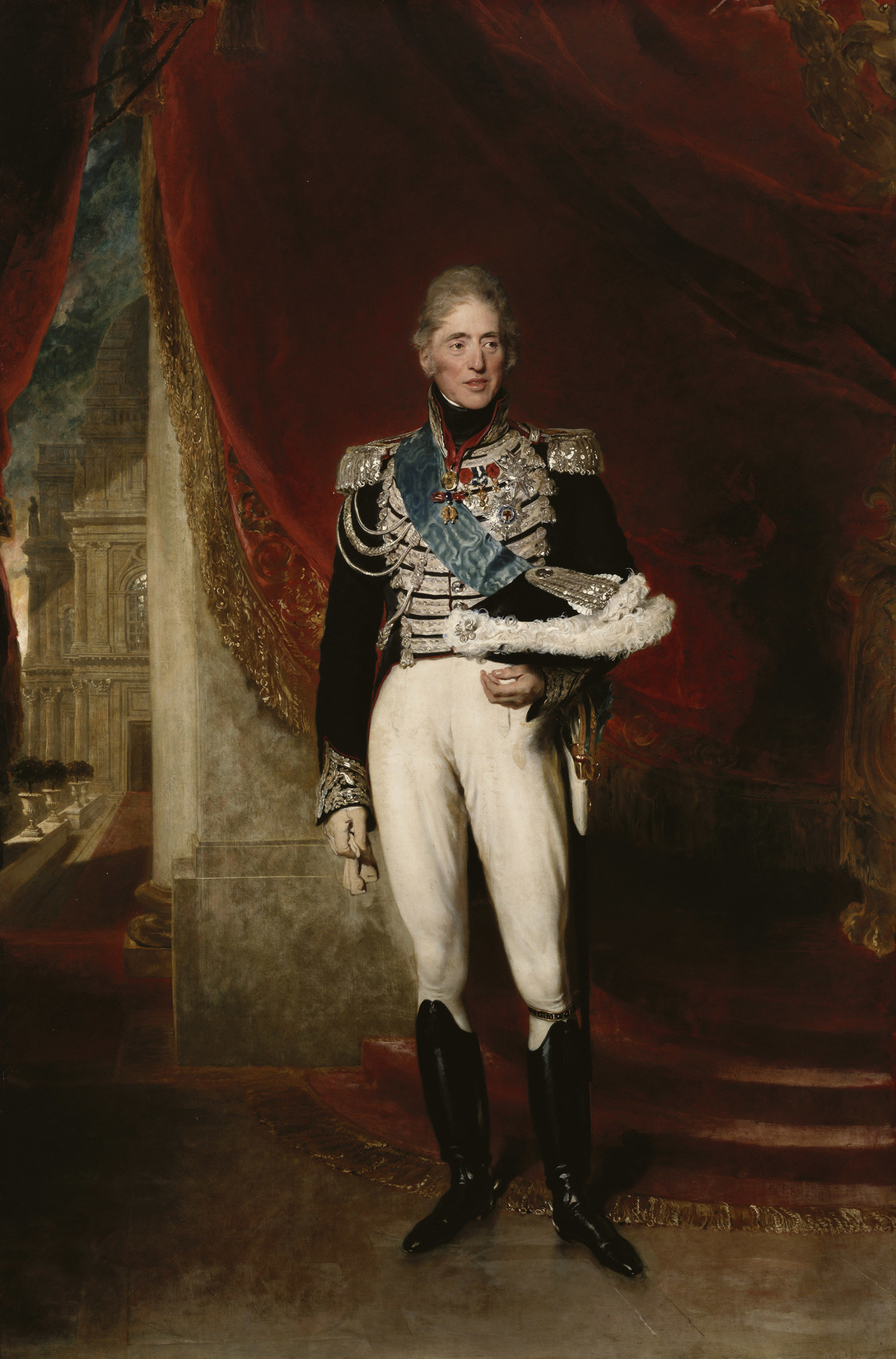
Portrait of Charles X by Sir Thomas Lawrence. It was commissioned by King George IV in 1825.

In London's Covent Garden, the pageant The Coronation of King Charles X was organised by Charles Kemble, based on the research of James Planché, and proved to be popular with audiences. The Italian composer Gioachino Rossini composed an opera, The Journey to Reims, focusing on several characters on their way to the coronation. It premiered in Paris on 19 June 1825. The same year, as part of a dual commission by King George IV, the English artist Sir Thomas Lawrence painted both Charles X and his eldest son, the duc d'Angoulême, for which Lawrence was awarded the Legion of Honour.

Despite the splendour of the coronation, political troubles continued throughout the King's reign. In 1830, he was overthrown in the July Revolution and went into exile in Britain. From 1830 until his death in 1836, he was the Legitimist claimant to the French throne. Louis Philippe, duc d'Orléans, usurped the crown shortly after and rejected the idea of a coronation in an attempt to appear more liberal. However, he too was overthrown in the French Revolution of 1848. Napoleon III, who established the Second Empire in 1852, never held a coronation ceremony, although a crown was designed for him in 1855.

== See also ==
- Coronation of Louis XVI, 1775 coronation of the elder brother of Charles X
- Coronation of George IV, 1821 coronation of the British monarch in London
- Coronation Coach of Charles X

== Bibliography ==
- Everist, Mark. Music Drama at the Paris Odéon, 1824–1828. University of California Press, 2002. ISBN 0520234456.
- Hill, Rosemary. Time's Witness: History in the Age of Romanticism. Penguin, 2021. ISBN 0141047097.
- James, Ralph N. Painters and Their Works: A Dictionary of Great Artists who are Not Now Alive, Giving Their Names, Lives, and the Prices Paid for Their Works at Auctions, Volume 2. L.U. Gill, 1897. ISBN 1295315203.
- Kladstrup, Don & Kladstrup, Petie. Champagne Charlie: The Frenchman Who Taught Americans to Love Champagne. University of Nebraska Press, 2021. ISBN 1640123946.
- Kroen, Sheryl. Politics and Theater: The Crisis of Legitimacy in Restoration France, 1815-1830. University of California Press, 2000. ISBN 0520222148.
- Pearson, Roger. Unacknowledged Legislators: The Poet as Lawgiver in Post-Revolutionary France. Oxford University Press, 2016. ISBN 0198754477.
- Peristiany, John George & Pitt-Rivers Julian. Honor and Grace in Anthropology. Cambridge University Press, 2005. ISBN 0521619327.
- Price, Munro. The Perilous Crown: France Between Revolutions, 1814-1848. Pan Macmillan, 2010. ISBN 1405040823.
- Roberts, Warren. Rossini and Post-Napoleonic Europe. Boydell & Brewer, 2015. ISBN 1580465307.
