= Jean-Baptiste de Latil =

French ecclesiastic

His Eminence Jean-Baptiste de Latil COHS
- Cardinal, Archbishop of Reims, Peer of France
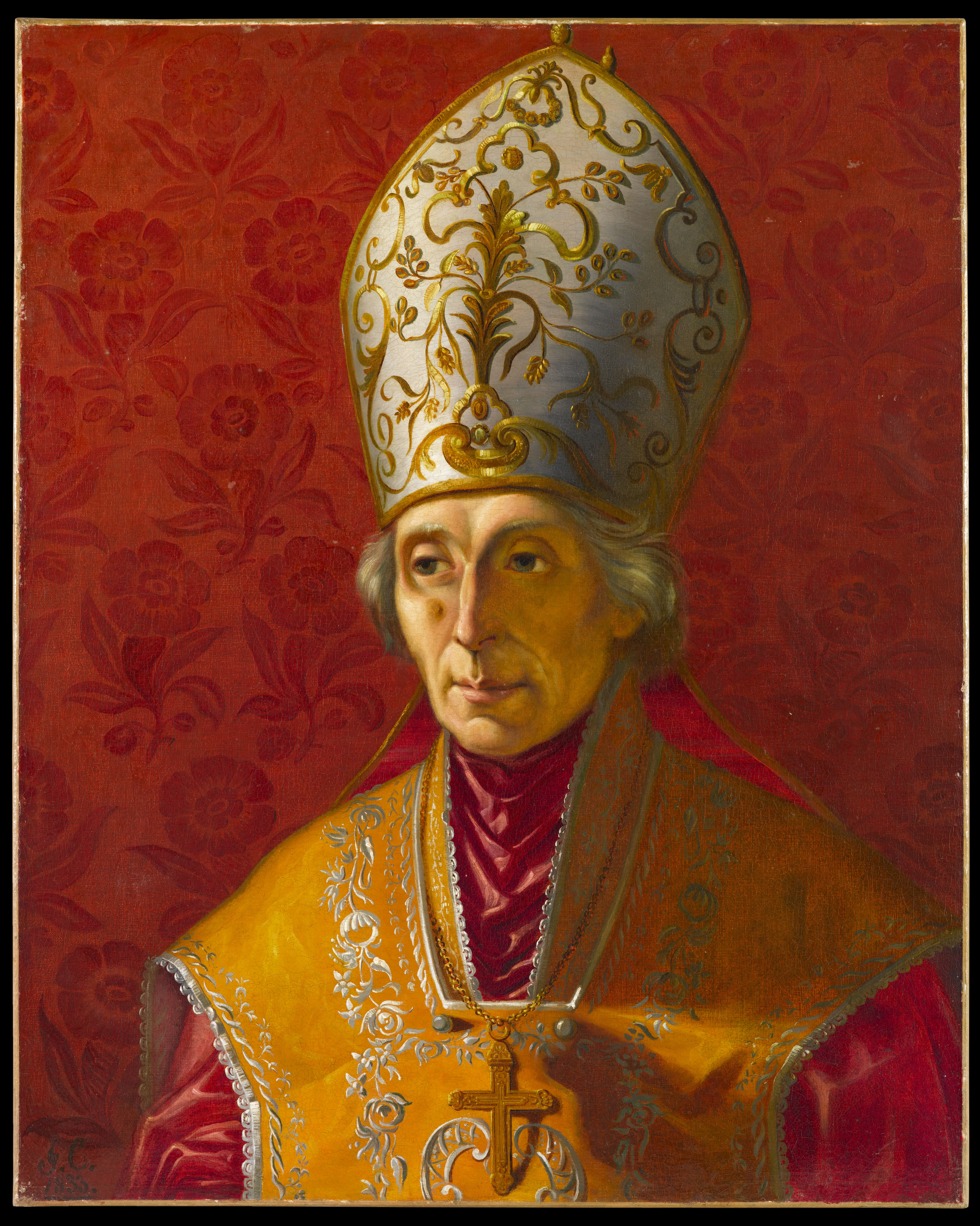
- Jean-Baptiste de Latil painted by Joseph Chabord
- Church: Roman Catholic Church
- Archdiocese: Reims
- See: Notre-Dame de Reims
- Installed: 12 July 1824
- Term ended: 1 December 1839
- Predecessor: Jean-Charles de Coucy
- Successor: Thomas-Marie-Joseph Gousset
- Other post: Cardinal-Priest of San Sisto
- Previous post: Bishop of Chartres

Personal details
- Born: 6 March 1761 Île Sainte-Marguerite, France
- Died: 1 December 1839 (aged 78) Gémenos, Provence, France
- Coat of arms

Jean-Baptiste Marie Antoine de Latil, count then duke of Latil, Peer of France, French ecclesiastic. He is the last to have crowned a King of France in the person of Charles X in 1825. He performed the coronation while Archbishop of Reims, five years before the July Revolution brought down the Bourbon Dynasty.

== Biography ==
Son of Antoine de Latil and Gabrielle Thérèse de Magny, he was born on Île Sainte-Marguerite on March 6, 1761. Ordained a priest in 1784, he was a priest in Saint-Sulpice Parish in Paris. In 1791, he refused to take an oath to the Civil Constitution of the Clergy. Imprisoned, he then went to Düsseldorf and entered the service of Charles Philippe, Count of Artois; he was appointed bishop in partibus Amiclée March 8, 1816 and ordered April 7, 1816, then named bishop of Chartres August 8, 1817. Archbishop of Rheims April 6, 1824; as such, he consecrated Charles X as king on May 29, 1825.

Latil became a Peer of France on October 31, 1822, and was appointed a knight commander of the Holy Spirit on May 12, 1825. He was created cardinal at the Consistory of March 13, 1826, with the title of Cardinal Priest of Saint Sixtus. He followed Charles X in his new exile of 1830.

Latil died in Gémenos (Bouches-du-Rhône) on December 1, 1839. His body is buried in the vault of the archbishops in the cathedral of Reims.
