= Entry of Charles X into Paris After His Coronation =

1825 painting by Louis-François Lejeune

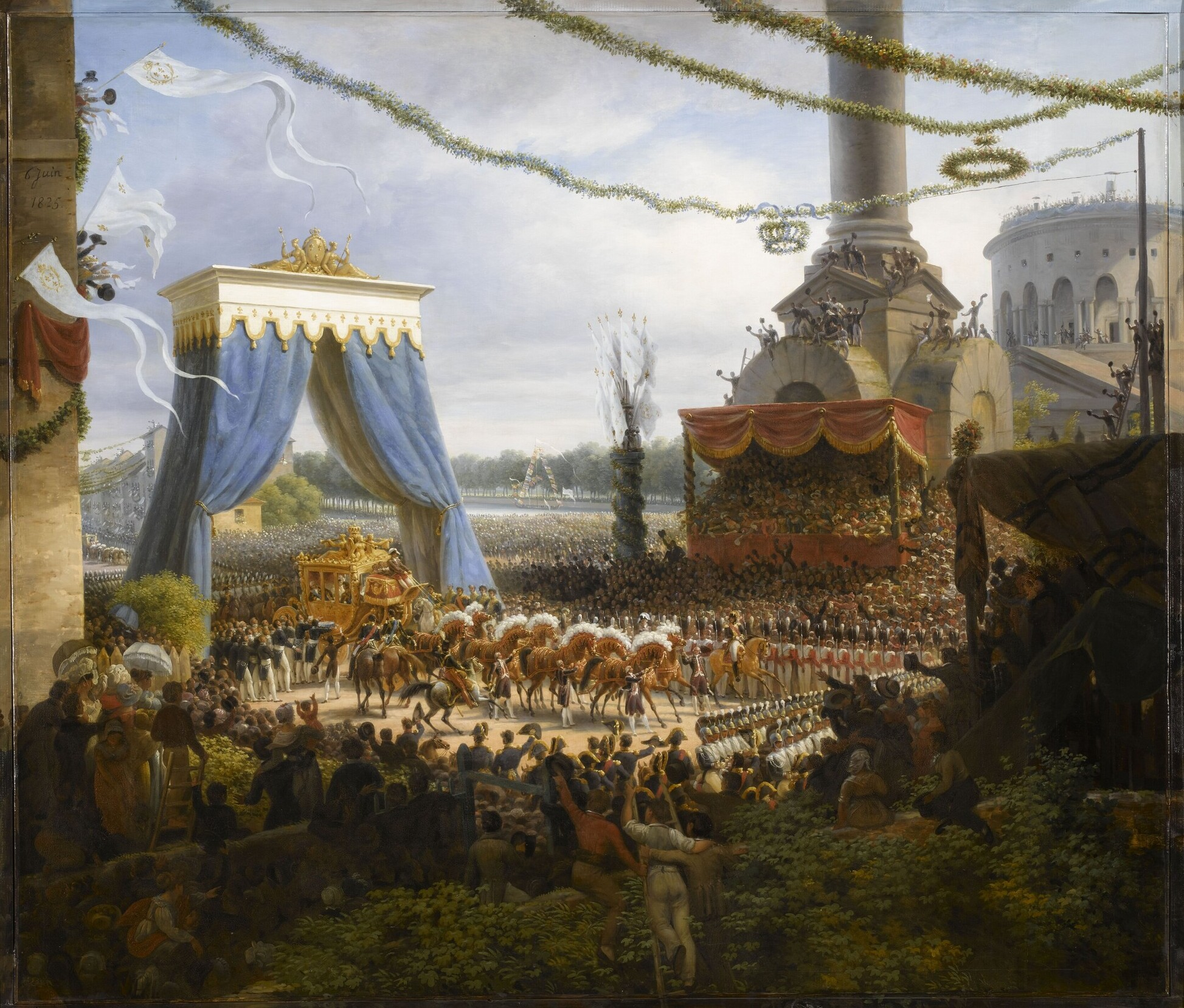
- Artist: Louis-François Lejeune
- Year: 1825
- Type: Oil on canvas, history painting
- Dimensions: 179 cm × 154 cm (70 in × 61 in)
- Location: Palace of Versailles, Versailles

Entry of Charles X into Paris, through the Barrière de la Villette, after his coronation. 6 June 1825 (French: Entrée de Charles X à Paris, par la barrière de la Villette, après son sacre. 6 juin 1825) is an 1825 history painting by the French artist Louis-François Lejeune. It depicts the entry of Charles X of France into his capital Paris following his coronation at Reims. The king is shown entering the city through the Villette Gate in his Coronation Coach. Today the painting is in the collection of the Palace of Versailles.

== Bibliography ==
- Chisholm, Hugh & Garvin, James Louis. The Encyclopædia Britannica: A Dictionary of Arts, Sciences, Literature & General Information, Volumes 15–16. Encyclopædia Britannica Company, Limited, 1926.
- Marrinan, Michael. Romantic Paris: Histories of a Cultural Landscape, 1800–1850. Stanford University Press, 2009.
