= Coronation of Louis XVI =

1775 coronation in France

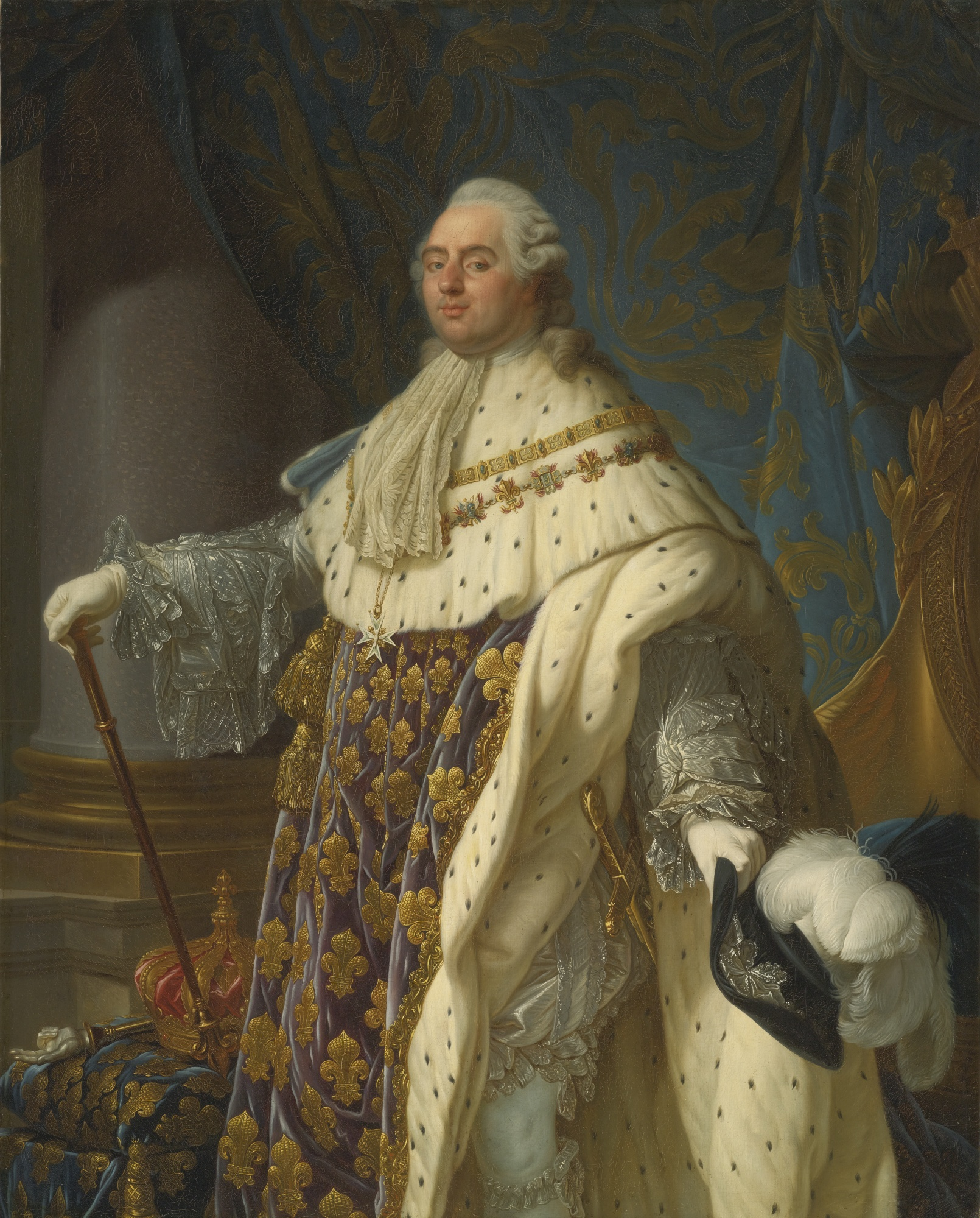
- Portrait of Louis XVI of France in coronation robes by Antoine Callet
- Date: 11 June 1775; 251 years ago
- Location: Reims Cathedral, Reims, France
- Participants: Louis XVI; Cardinal Charles Antoine, Archbishop of Reims

The coronation of Louis XVI as King of France and Navarre took place in Reims Cathedral on 11 June 1775, which fell on Trinity Sunday. Louis XVI had come to the throne the previous year in succession to his grandfather Louis XV who had reigned for 59 years. It was the first coronation since 1722 and only the second since 1654 due to the longevity of the two previous monarchs, Louis XIV and Louis XV.

The city of Reims in Champagne was the traditional site of French coronations, a ceremony that stretched back in some form to the baptism of Clovis I in the city. The ceremony was performed by Charles Antoine de La Roche-Aymon, the Archbishop of Reims. Louis was crowned alone, his wife Marie Antoinette, whom he had married in 1770 in a dynastic match to support the Franco-Austrian alliance, was not crowned as by the 18th century queens weren't crowned. The couple were childless at the time of the coronation but went on to have several children following the birth of Marie-Thérèse de France in 1778.

In contrast to his predecessors Louis XVI rejected a role as leader of fashion and ceremony, and as soon as the coronation was over he took off his heavy coronation robes and never wore them again. He preferred lighter and less ceremonial dress at court.

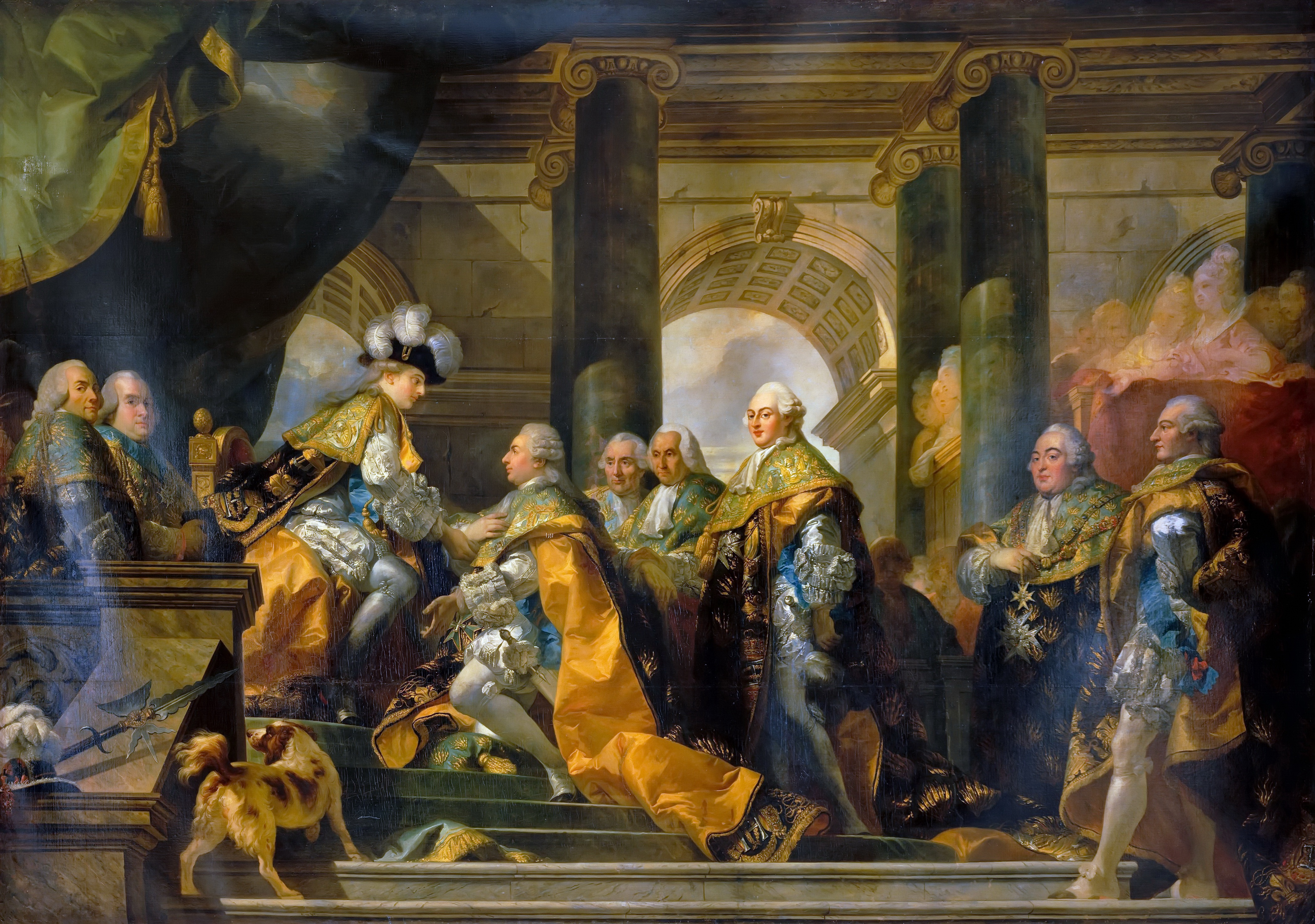
Louis XVI receiving the homage of the members of the Order of the Holy Spirit

It was the last coronation of the ancien régime before the French Revolution led to the overthrow of the monarchy. It was also the penultimate coronation of a King of France, followed only by the coronation of Charles X (Louis XVI's younger brother the Count of Artois) in Reims during the Bourbon Restoration.

== See also ==
- Coronation of George III, the 1761 London coronation of George III, the British contemporary of Louis XVI

== Bibliography ==
- Baker, Michael Keith. Inventing the French Revolution: Essays on French Political Culture in the Eighteenth Century. Cambridge University Press, 1990. ISBN 0521385784.
- Caiani, Ambrogio A. To Kidnap a Pope: Napoleon and Pius VII. Yale University Press, 2021. ISBN 0300251335.
- Jones, Colin. The Great Nation: France from Louis XV to Napoleon. Penguin UK, 2003. ISBN 0140130934.
- McManners, John. Church and Society in Eighteenth-century France: The clerical establishment and its social ramifications. Clarendon Press, 1998. ISBN 0198270038
- Price, Munro. The Perilous Crown: France Between Revolutions, 1814–1848. Pan Macmillan, 2010. ISBN 1405040823
