= The Coronation of Charles X =

1827 painting by François Gérard

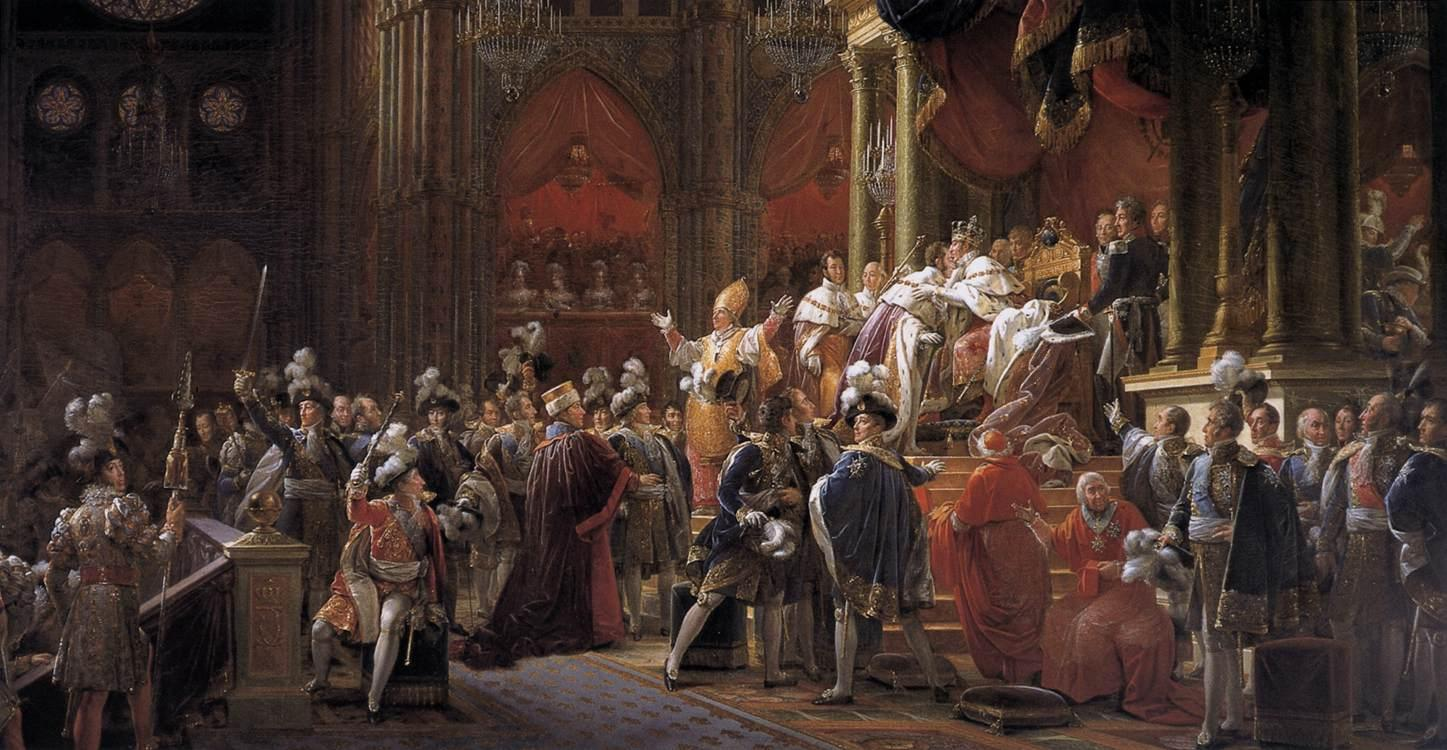
- Artist: François Gérard
- Year: 1827
- Type: Oil on canvas, history painting
- Dimensions: 514 cm × 972 cm (202 in × 383 in)
- Location: Musée des Beaux-Arts; Chartres

The Coronation of Charles X (French: Le sacre de Charles X) is an 1827 history painting by the French artist François Gérard depicting the Coronation of Charles X of France at Reims Cathedral on 29 May 1825.

Charles X had succeeded his brother Louis XVIII in September 1824. His was the last coronation in France and was part of a move to revive pre-French Revolution traditions during the Restoration era. Gérard, a student of Jacques-Louis David, had made his name painting portraits during the Napoleonic era. After the House of Bourbon returned to the throne post 1814 he shifted to celebrations of the monarchy.

The large painting features individual portraits of the various participants. Today it is in the collection of the Musée des Beaux-Arts in Chartres.

== See also ==
- The Coronation of Napoleon, a painting by Jacques-Louis David

== Bibliography ==
- González-Palacios, Alvar. David and Napoleonic Painting. Fabbri, 1970.
- Jones, Colin. The Cambridge Illustrated History of France. ISBN 0521669928. Cambridge University Press, 1999.
- Price, Munro. The Perilous Crown: France Between Revolutions, 1814-1848. ISBN 1405040823. Pan Macmillan, 2010.
- Strieter, Terry W. Nineteenth-Century European Art: A Topical Dictionary. ISBN 0861721152. Bloomsbury Academic, 1999.
