= Salon (Paris) =

Periodic art exhibition in Paris (17th–19th c.)

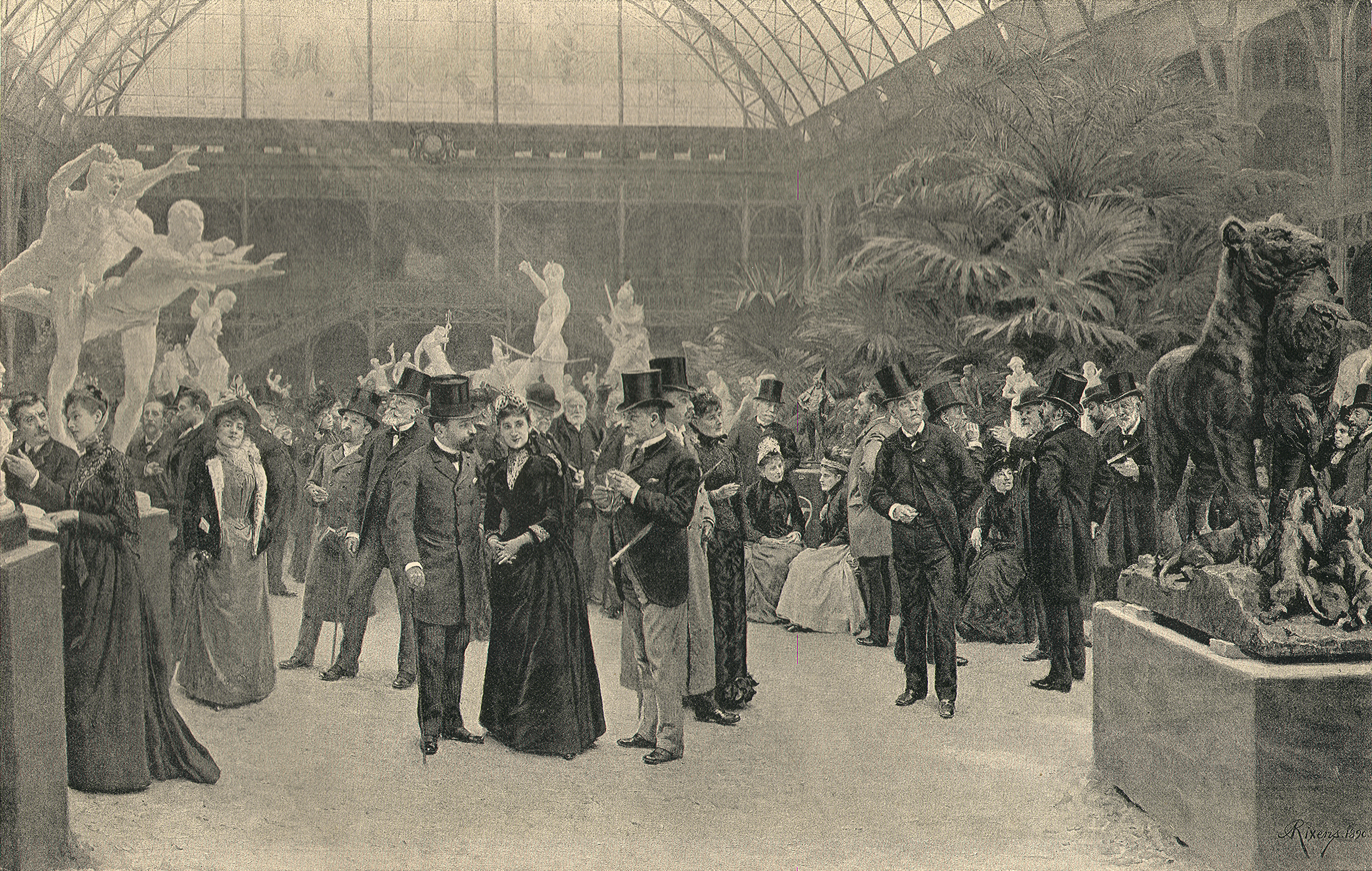
Formally dressed patrons at the Salon in 1890. Un Jour de vernissage au palais des Champs-Élysées by Jean-André Rixens featuring Tigresse apportant un paon à ses petits by Auguste Cain.

The Salon, or sometimes Paris Salon (French: Salon de Paris [salɔ̃ d(ə) paʁi]), beginning in 1667, was the official art exhibition of the Académie des Beaux-Arts in Paris. Between 1748 and 1890 it was arguably the greatest annual or biennial art event in the Western world.

At the Salon of 1761, thirty-three painters, nine sculptors, and eleven engravers contributed. From 1881 onward, it was managed by the Société des Artistes Français.

== Origins ==
In 1667, the royally sanctioned French institution of art patronage, the Académie royale de peinture et de sculpture (a division of the Académie des beaux-arts), held its first semi-public art exhibit at the Salon Carré. The Salon's original focus was the display of the work of recent graduates of the École des Beaux-Arts, which was created by Cardinal Mazarin, chief minister of France, in 1648. Exhibition at the Salon de Paris was essential for any artist to achieve success in France for at least the next 200 years. Exhibition in the Salon marked a sign of royal favor.

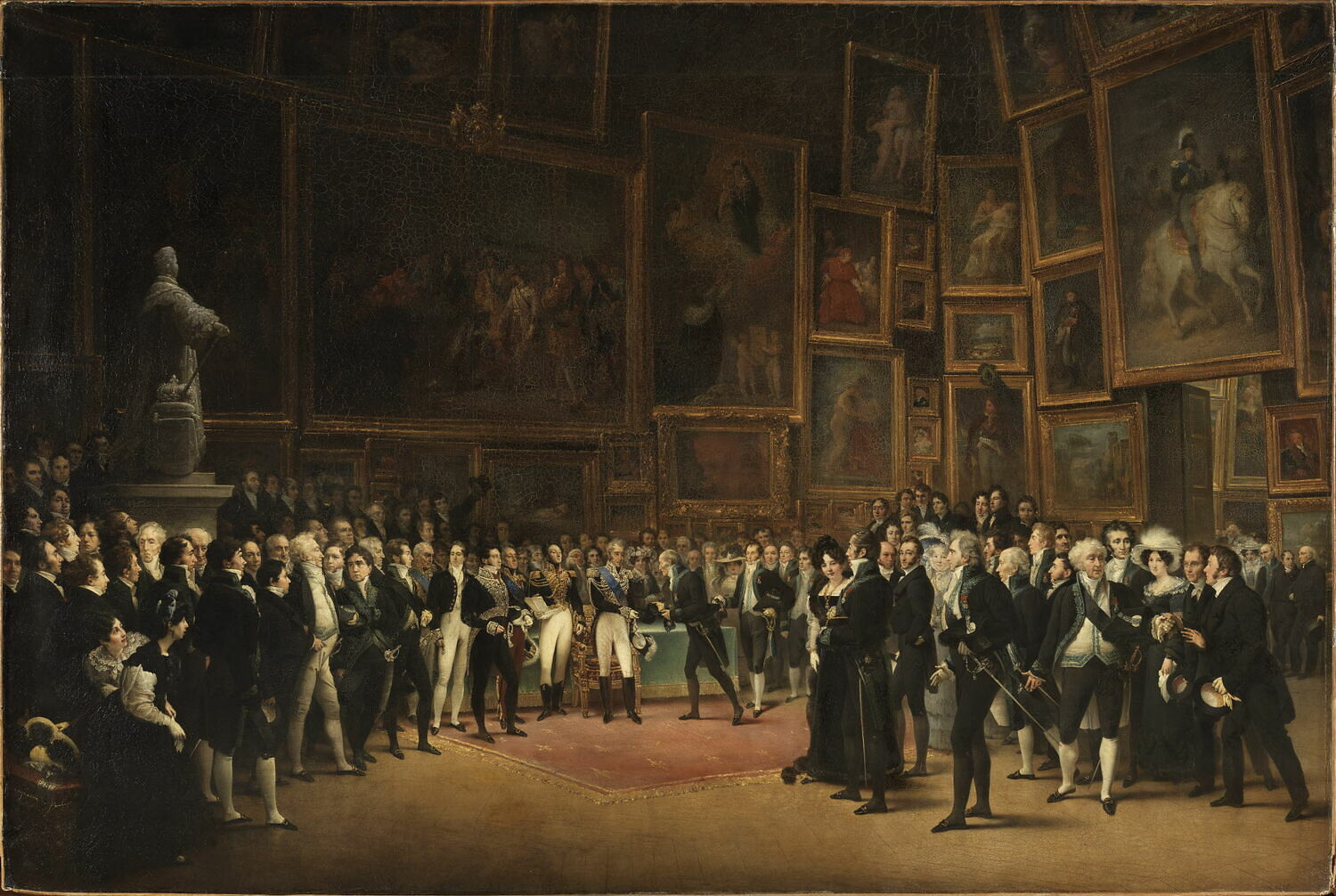
Charles X Distributing Awards to Artists for the Salon of 1824. An 1827 painting by François Joseph Heim, now in the Louvre.

In 1725, the Salon was held in the Palace of the Louvre, when it became known as Salon or Salon de Paris. In 1737, the exhibitions, held from 18 August 1737 to 5 September 1737 at the Grand Salon of the Louvre, became public. They were held, at first, annually, and then biennially, in odd-numbered years. They would start on the feast day of St. Louis (25 August) and run for some weeks. Once made regular and public, the Salon's status was "never seriously in doubt." In 1748 a jury of awarded artists was introduced. From this time forward, the influence of the Salon was undisputed.

== Prominence (1748–1890) ==
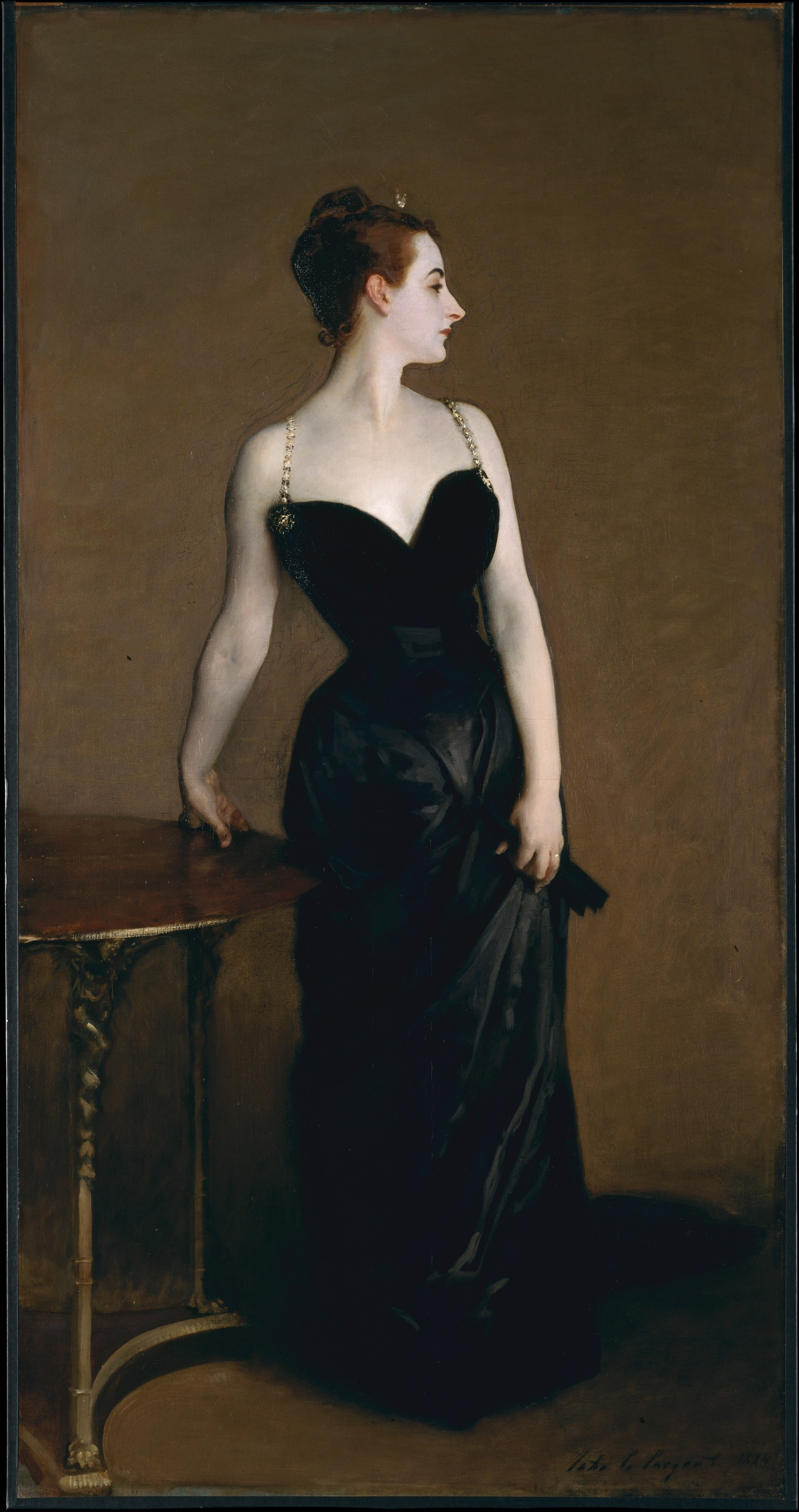
This portrait by John Singer Sargent of Virginie Amélie Avegno Gautreau depicting her cleavage caused considerable controversy when it was displayed at the 1884 Salon.

The Salon exhibited paintings floor-to-ceiling and on every available inch of space. The jostling of artwork became the subject of many other paintings, including Pietro Antonio Martini's Salon of 1785. Printed catalogues of the Salons are primary documents for art historians. Critical descriptions of the exhibitions published in the gazettes mark the beginning of the modern occupation of art critic. The French salon, a product of the Enlightenment in the early 18th century, was a key institution in which women played a central role. Salons provided a place for women and men to congregate for intellectual discourse.

The French Revolution opened the exhibition to foreign artists. The Salon of 1824 was noted for its displays of British paintings by John Constable, Thomas Lawrence and Richard Parkes Bonington. In the 19th century the idea of a public Salon extended to an annual government-sponsored juried exhibition of new painting and sculpture, held in large commercial halls, to which the ticket-bearing public was invited. The vernissage (varnishing) of opening night was a grand social occasion, and a crush that gave subject matter to newspaper caricaturists like Honoré Daumier. Charles Baudelaire, Denis Diderot and others wrote reviews of the Salons.

After the French Revolution of 1848 liberalized the Salon, far fewer works were refused. Medals were introduced in 1849.

=== Early splinter groups ===
The increasingly conservative and academic juries were not receptive to the Impressionist painters, whose works were usually rejected, or poorly placed if accepted. The Salon opposed the Impressionists' shift away from traditional painting styles. In 1863 the Salon jury turned away an unusually high number of the submitted paintings. An uproar resulted, particularly from regular exhibitors who had been rejected. In order to prove that the Salons were democratic, Napoleon III instituted the Salon des Refusés, containing a selection of the works that the Salon had rejected that year. It opened on 17 May 1863, marking the birth of the avant-garde. The Impressionists held their own independent exhibitions in 1874, 1876, 1877, 1879, 1880, 1881, 1882 and 1886.

In 1881 the government withdrew official sponsorship from the annual Salon, and a group of artists organized the Société des Artistes Français to take responsibility for the show.

== Secessions ==
In December 1890, the leader of the Société des Artistes Français, William-Adolphe Bouguereau, proposed that the Salon should be an exhibition of young, not-yet-awarded, artists. Ernest Meissonier, Puvis de Chavannes, Auguste Rodin and others rejected the proposal and broke way to create the Société Nationale des Beaux-Arts, with its own exhibition, immediately referred to in the press as the Salon du Champ de Mars or the Salon de la Société Nationale des Beaux–Arts. Soon, it was also widely known as the Nationale.

In 1903, in response to what many artists at the time felt was a bureaucratic and conservative organization, a group of painters and sculptors, led by Pierre-Auguste Renoir and Auguste Rodin, organized the Salon d'Automne.

As the number of salons increased, American newspapers sometimes referred to the original salon as the Salon of the Champs Elysees.

=== Historiography and interpretation ===
The Paris Salon functioned as the primary official exhibition in France from the eighteenth through the nineteenth centuries, shaping both artistic standards and public taste in Western art. Participation in the Salon was closely associated with acceptance by the Académie des Beaux-Arts and significantly influenced an artist's professional reputation and opportunities for patronage. The Salon jury's selection criteria prioritized genres such as history painting and classical subjects, reflecting institutional academic values. Consequently, Salon exhibitions reinforced established conventions of technique, subject matter, and aesthetic propriety during this period.

Art historians have also examined the Salon's relationship with emerging modern movements. The conservative selection criteria of the official Salon contributed to tensions with avant-garde artists, culminating in the Salon des Refusés of 1863, which publicly exhibited works rejected by the official jury and attracted significant attention to new artistic tendencies. These alternative exhibitions provided space for artists who challenged academic orthodoxy and contributed to the development of movements such as Impressionism.

== Art historical interpretation ==
The Paris Salon, as the preeminent official art exhibition in France from the eighteenth through the nineteenth centuries, played a central role in shaping artistic standards and public taste in Western art. Participation in the Salon was closely tied to acceptance by the Académie des Beaux-Arts and often determined an artist's professional reputation and opportunities for patronage. The hierarchical preferences of the Salon jury emphasized genres such as history painting and classical subjects, reflecting academic values upheld by institutions of artistic authority. Consequently, Salon exhibitions helped to reinforce established conventions of technique, subject matter, and aesthetic propriety in the art of the period.

Art historians have also examined the Salon's relationship with emerging modern movements. The conservative selection criteria of the official Salon contributed to tensions with avant-garde artists, culminating in landmark events such as the Salon des Refusés of 1863. This exhibition publicly displayed works rejected by the official jury and drew significant attention to new artistic tendencies. These alternative exhibitions provided space for artists who challenged academic orthodoxy and laid groundwork for movements such as Impressionism, illustrating the Salon's complex role in both maintaining tradition and stimulating artistic change.

== See also ==
- Academic art
- Académie de peinture et de sculpture
- Académie des beaux-arts
- Salon (gathering)
- French salons and exhibitions

Other salons

- Salon des Refusés
- Salon des Indépendants
- Salon d'Automne
- Women's literary salons and societies in the Arab world

== Gallery ==
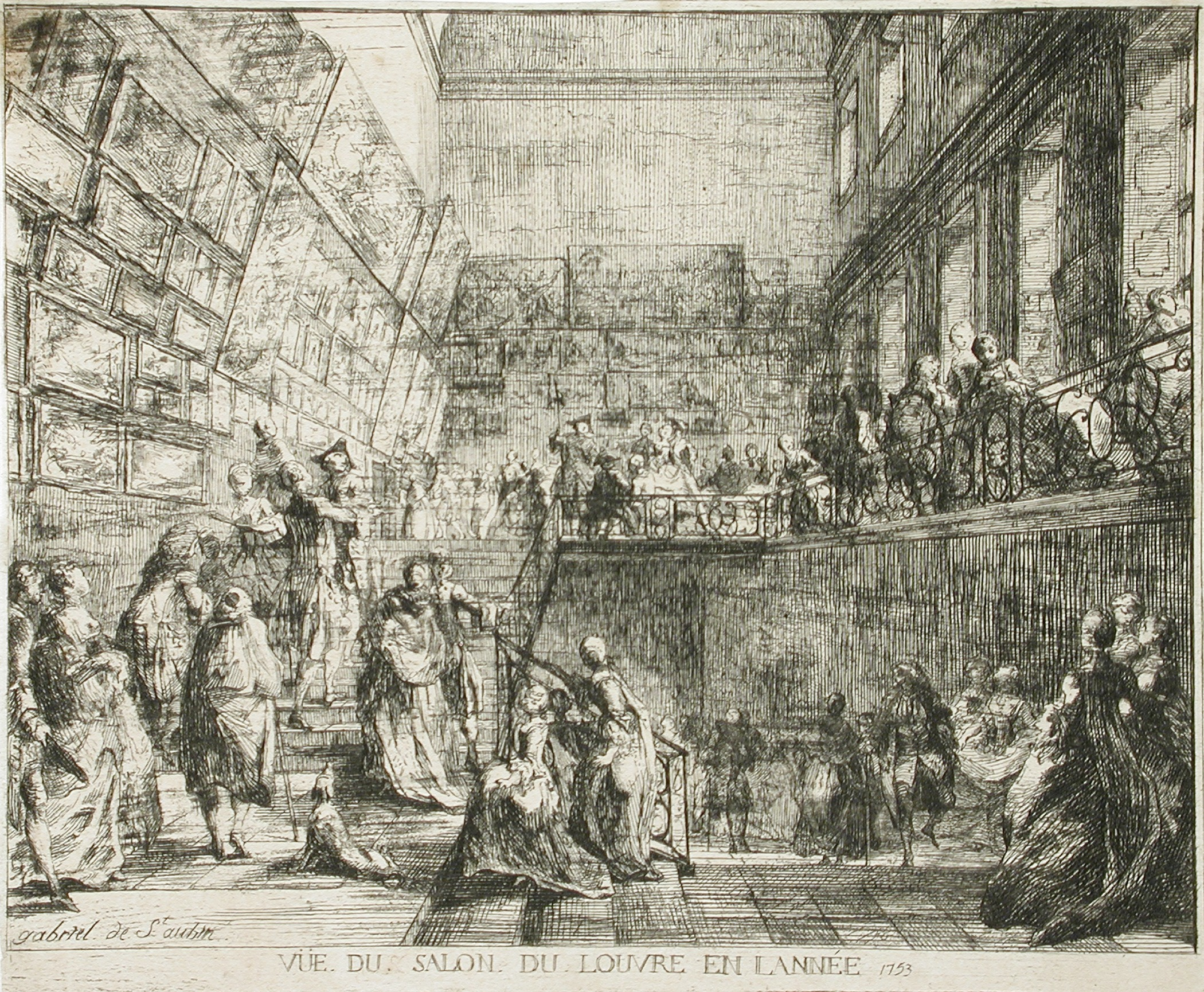
Salon of 1753

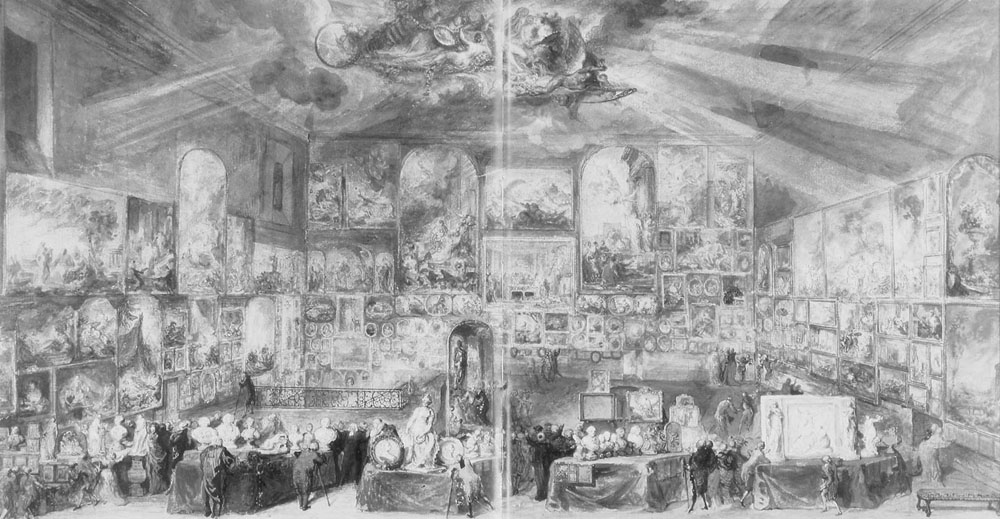
Salon of 1767

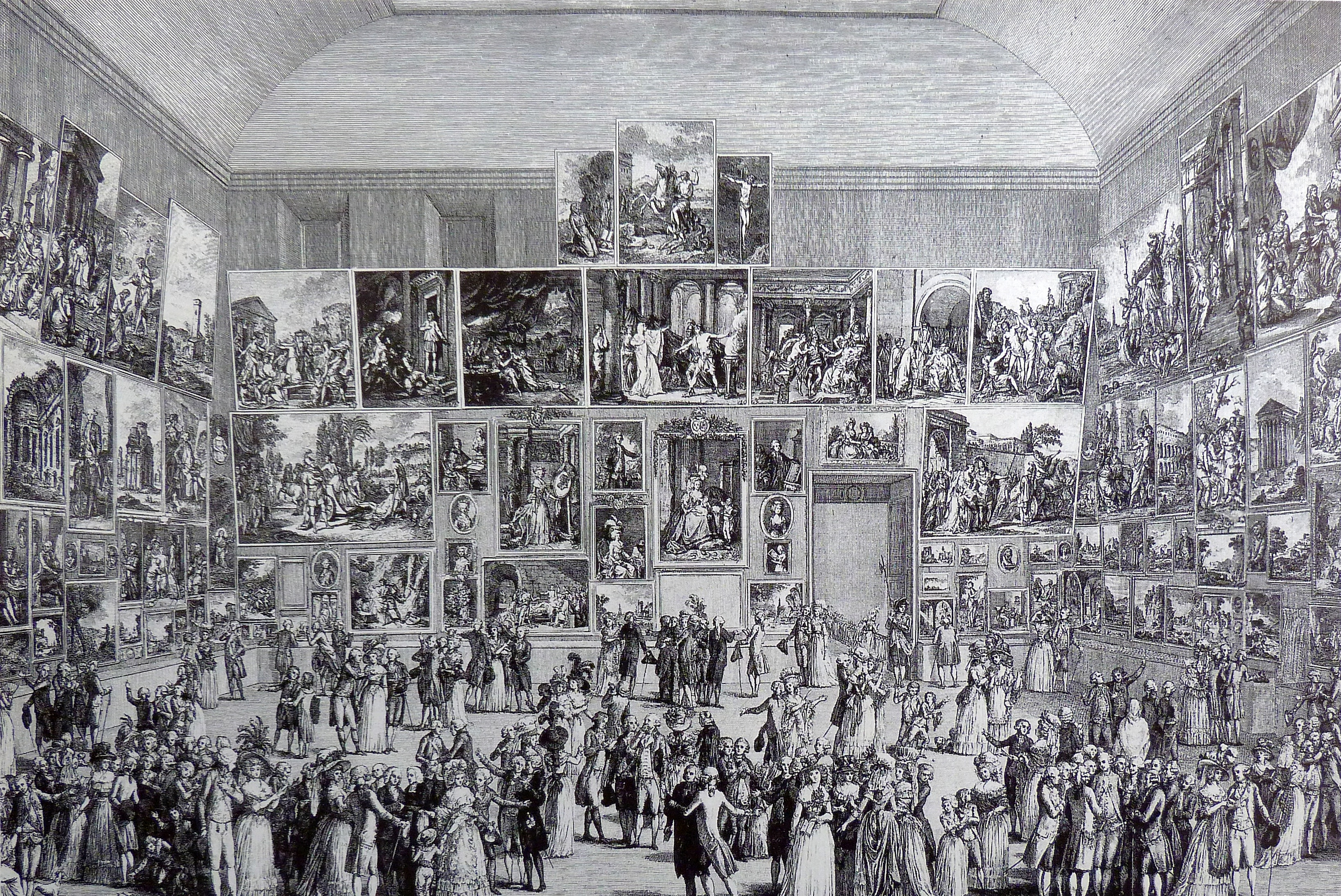
Etching of the Salon of 1787 by Pietro Antonio Martini

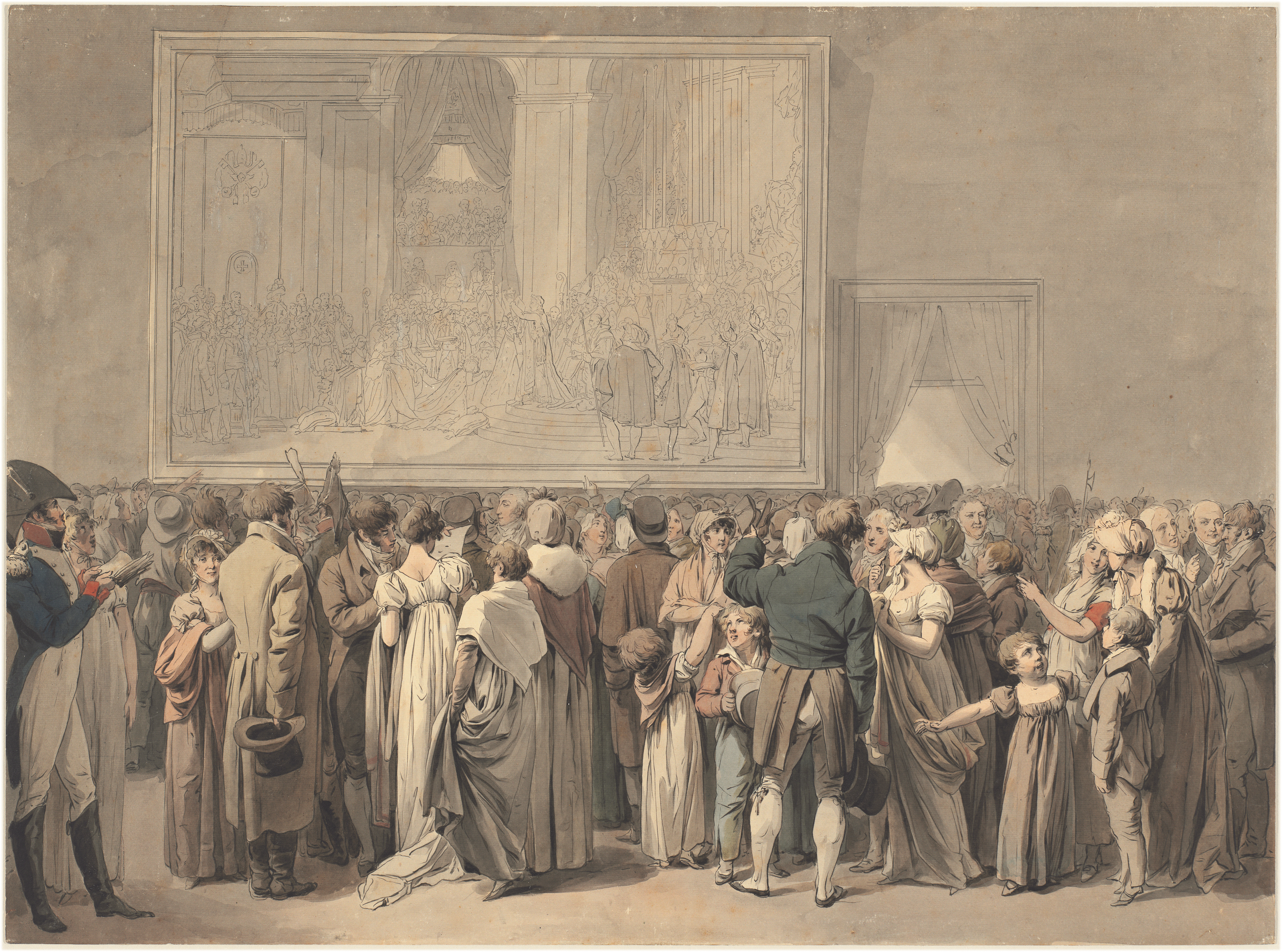
Salon of 1808

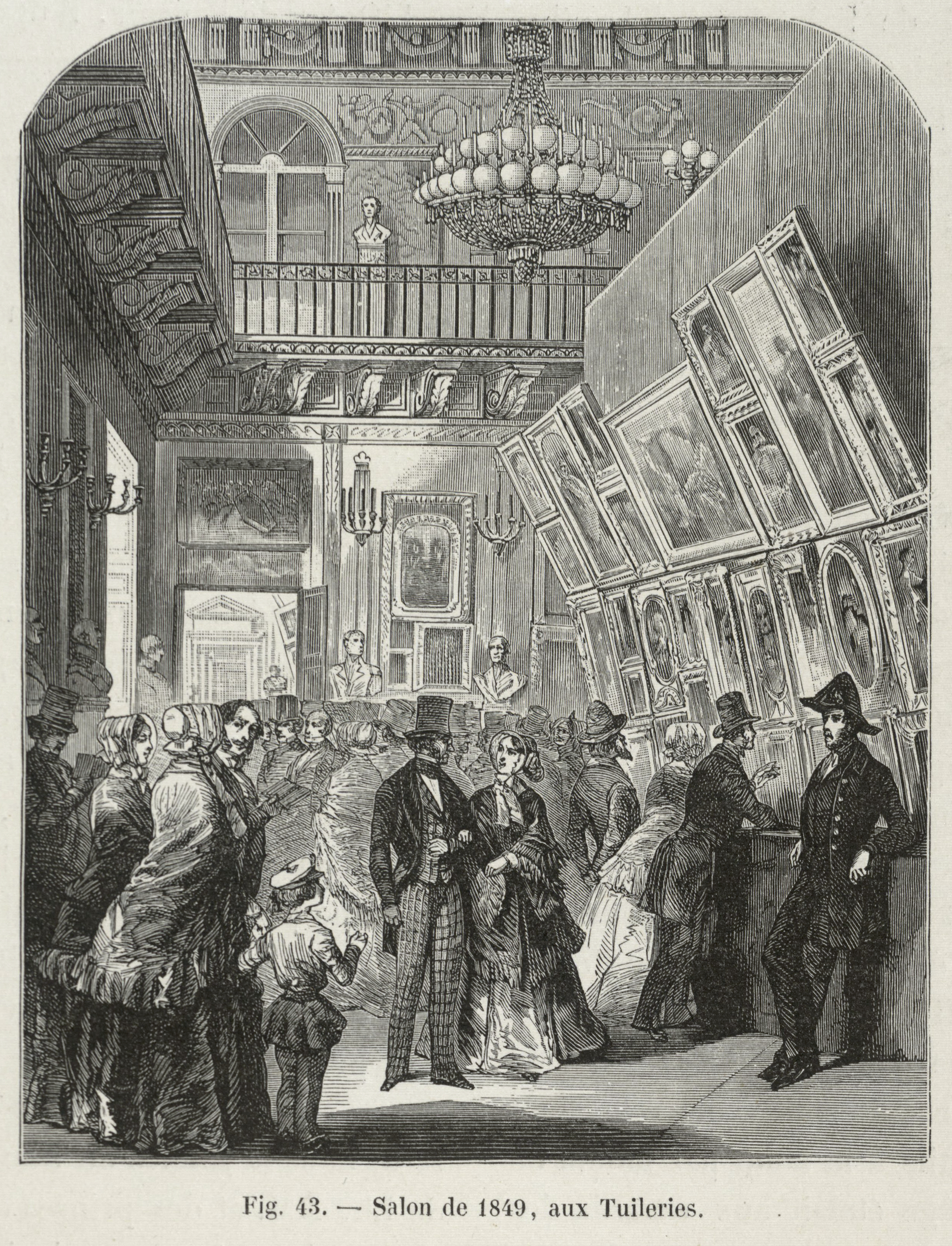
Salon of 1849, held at the Tuileries Palace

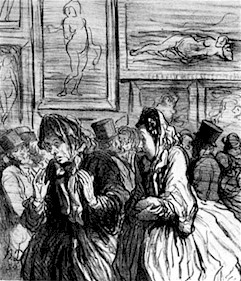
Honoré Daumier, Bourgeoises scandalized by the Salon's Venuses, Salon of 1864

Cabaillot-Lassalle, Le Salon de 1874

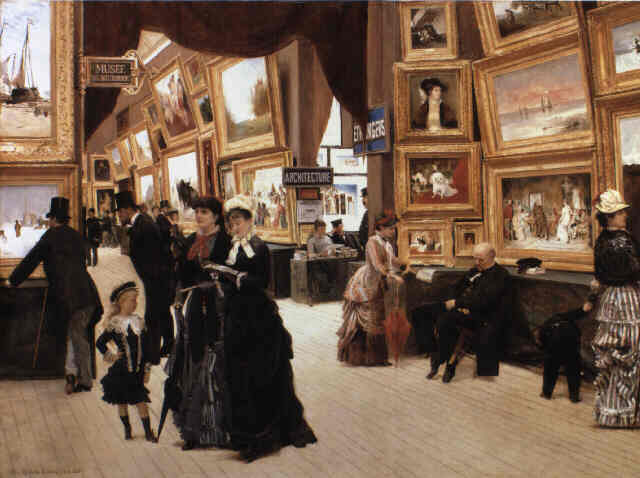
Edouard Dantan, Un Coin du Salon en 1880

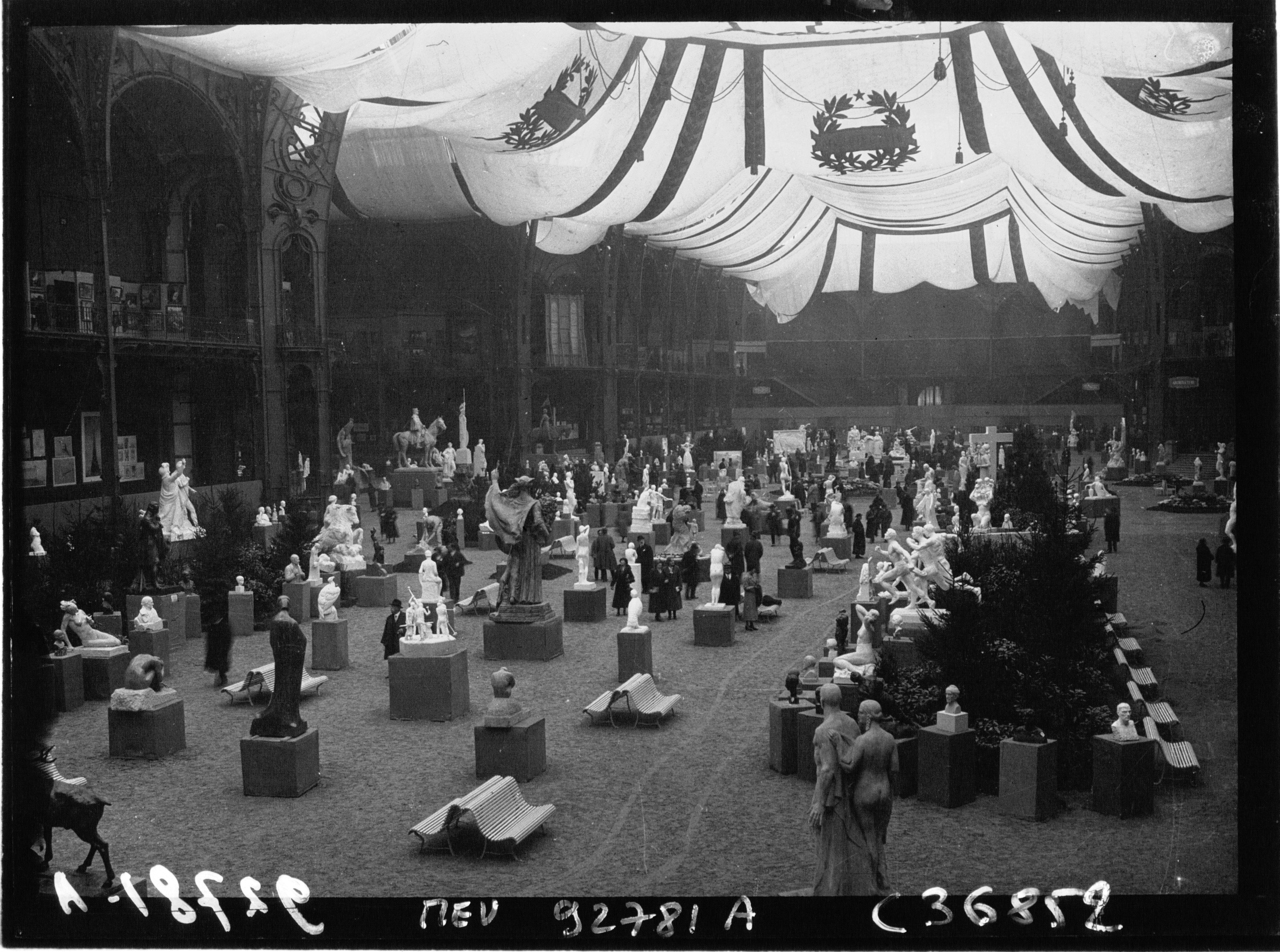
Salon of 1932, Grand Palais, Paris

== Sources ==
- J. J. Marquet de Vasselot: Répertoire des catalogues du musée du Louvre, 1793–1917
- Thomas Crow: Painters and Public Life in 18th Century Paris. Yale University Press 1987
- Patricia Mainardi: The End of the Salon: Art and the State in the Early Third Republic, Cambridge University Press, 1993.
- Fae Brauer, Rivals and Conspirators: The Paris Salons and the Modern Art Centre, Newcastle upon Tyne, Cambridge Scholars, 2013.
- Albert Boime, "The Salon des Refuses and the Evolution of Modern Art", Art Quarterly 32 (Winter 1969): 41 1–26
- Margo Bistis, "Bad Art: The Decline of Academic Art in the Caricatural Salon", International Journal of Comic Art 7, no.1 (Spring 2005); 126–148.
