= Salon Carré =

Room in the Louvre

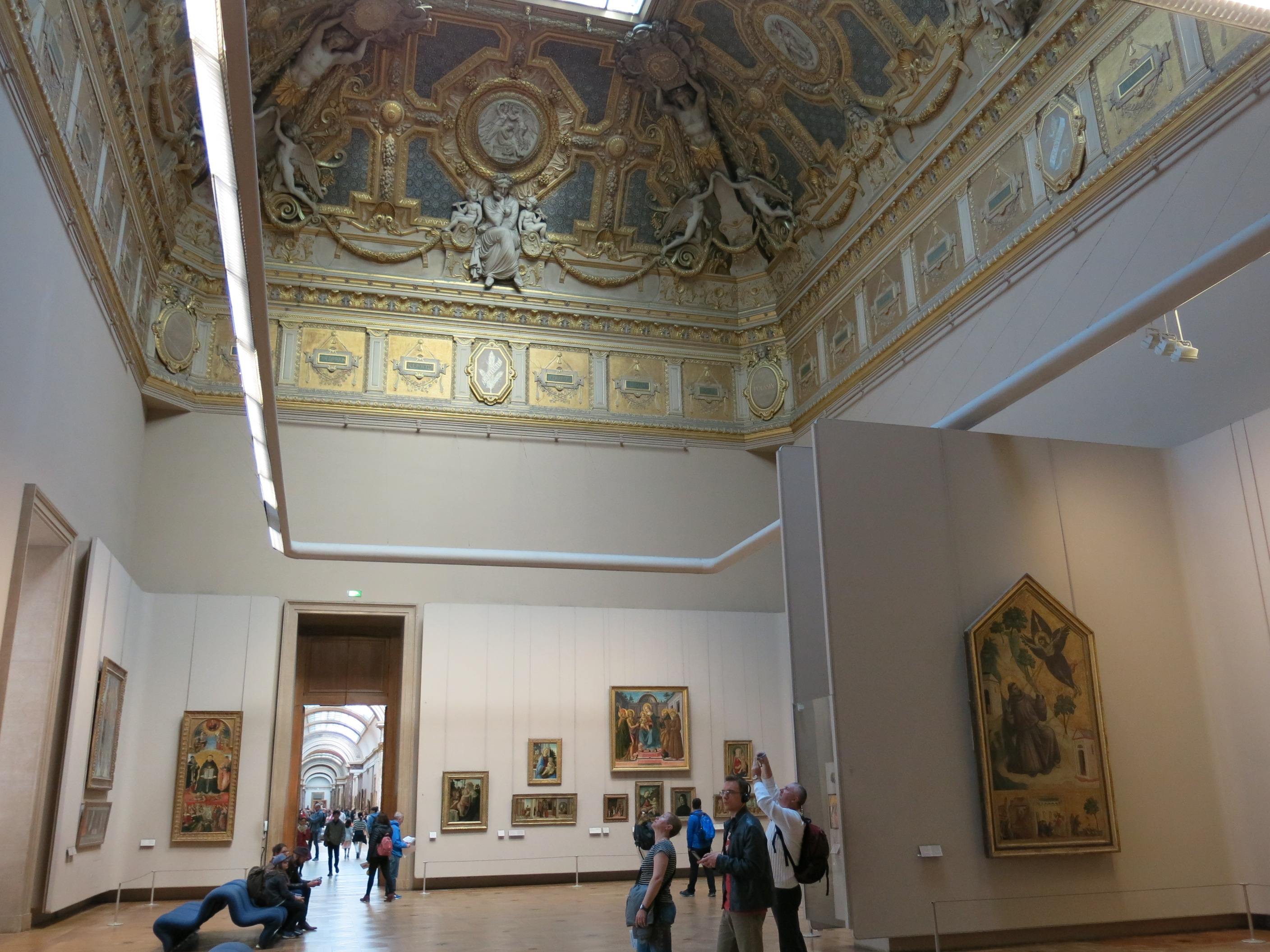
The Salon Carré in 2018

The Salon Carré (French pronunciation: [salɔ̃ kaʁe]) is an iconic room of the Louvre Palace, created in its current dimensions during a reconstruction of that part of the palace following a fire in February 1661. It gave its name to the longstanding tradition of Salon exhibitions of contemporary art in Paris which had its heyday there between 1725 and 1848. Since 1849, it has been permanently used by the Louvre Museum, which currently uses it to display Italian Renaissance painting.

== History ==
When the Grande Galerie was built in the late 16th and early 17th centuries, a separate room was created at its eastern end above the lavishly decorated Salon des Ambassadeurs on the ground floor. That upper room was known at the time as Grand Salon or Salon du Louvre. This room was destroyed together with the nearby Galerie des Rois by the fire of 6 February 1661. Louis Le Vau rebuilt it on an expanded footprint, including further space to the north that gave it more width and its current name, even though its plan is rectangular and not square.

In the 18th century the room was used for the Salon, which led to the construction of successive dedicated staircases to provide it with a dedicated entrance. In the 1780s, its design was debated in the context of early plans to create a permanent museum in the room, leading to the creation in 1789 of a skylight in its roofing, designed by Charles-Axel Guillaumot and one of the first such examples for art exhibition purposes.

On 2 April 1810, Napoleon and Marie Louise of Austria led a procession from the Tuileries Palace throughout the Grande Galerie on the occasion of their wedding, which was celebrated in the Salon Carré, temporarily converted into a chapel.

In 1848, the Louvre's new director Philippe-Auguste Jeanron successfully advocated the relocation of the Salon outside of the Louvre, so that the Salon Carré would be devoted to permanent museum use. The room was subsequently redecorated by architect Félix Duban, with sculptor Pierre-Charles Simart creating a richly decorated ceiling of gilded stucco celebrating past French artists, still in place. The refurbished room was inaugurated on 5 June 1851, together with the renovated Grande Galerie, Galerie d’Apollon, and Salle des Sept-Cheminées.

In 1972, the Salon Carré's museography was remade with lighting from a hung tubular case, designed by Louvre architect Marc Saltet with assistance from designers André Monpoix, Joseph-André Motte and Pierre Paulin.

== Gallery ==
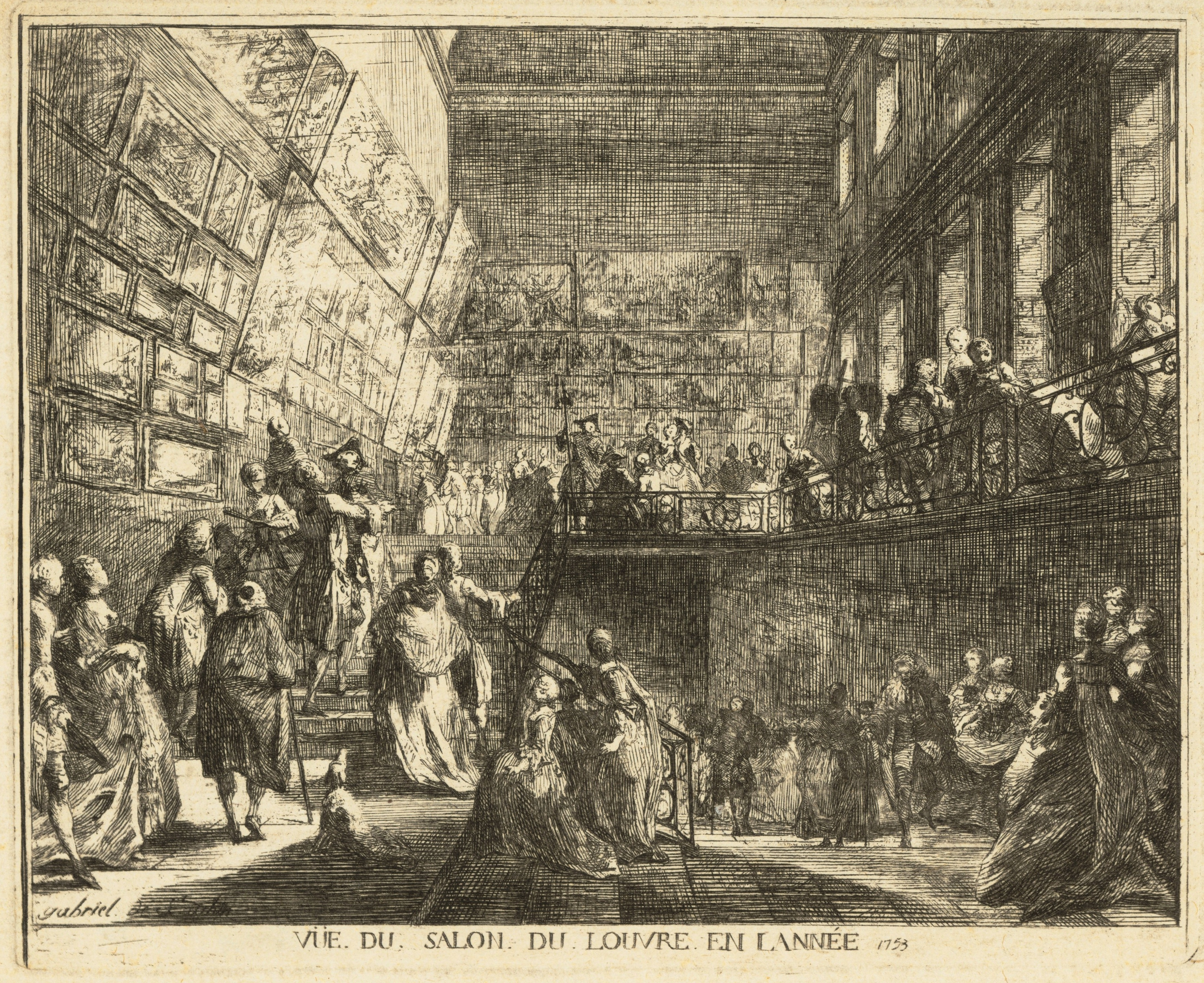
The Salon in 1753, by Gabriel de Saint-Aubin (Metropolitan Museum of Art)

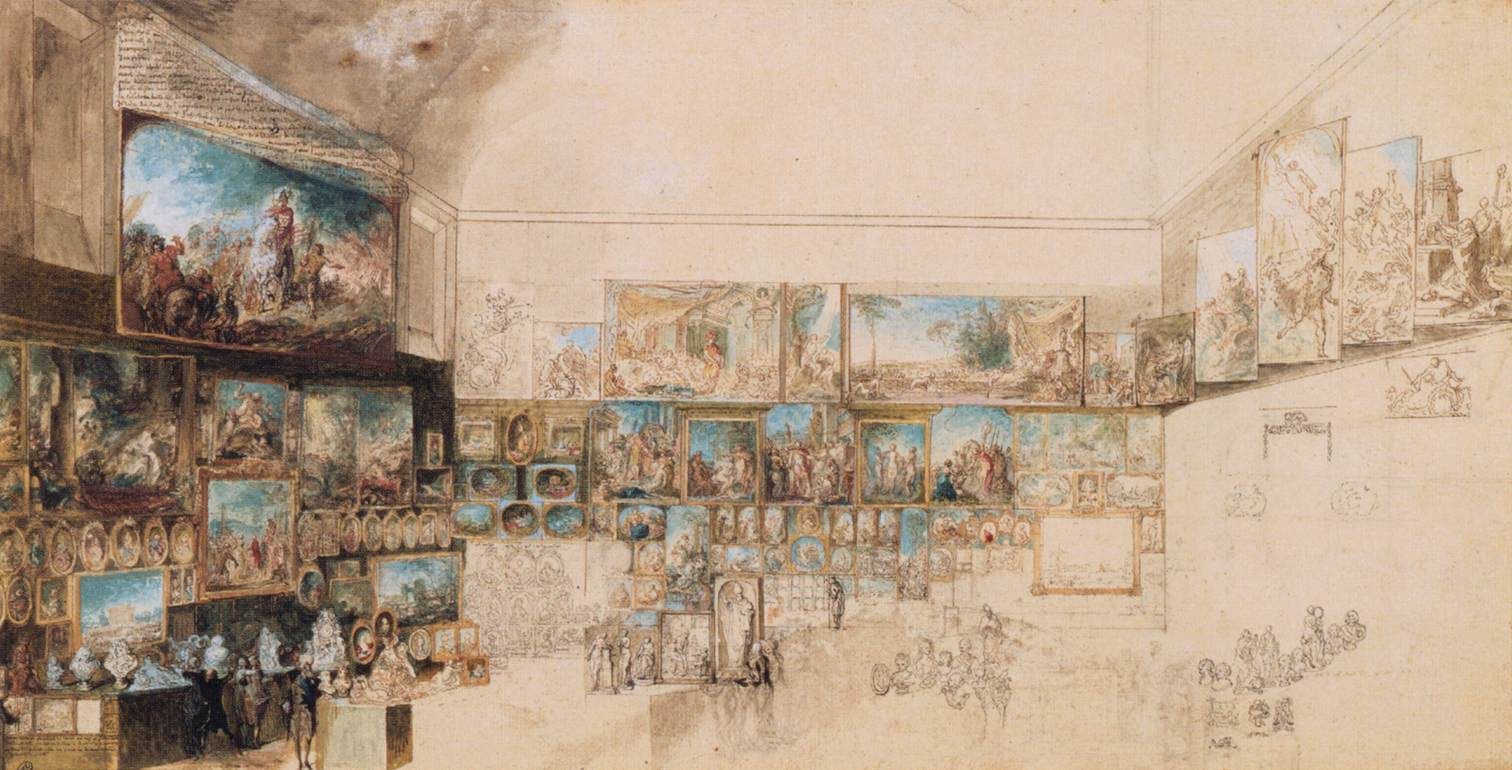
The Salon in 1753, by Gabriel de Saint-Aubin (Louvre)

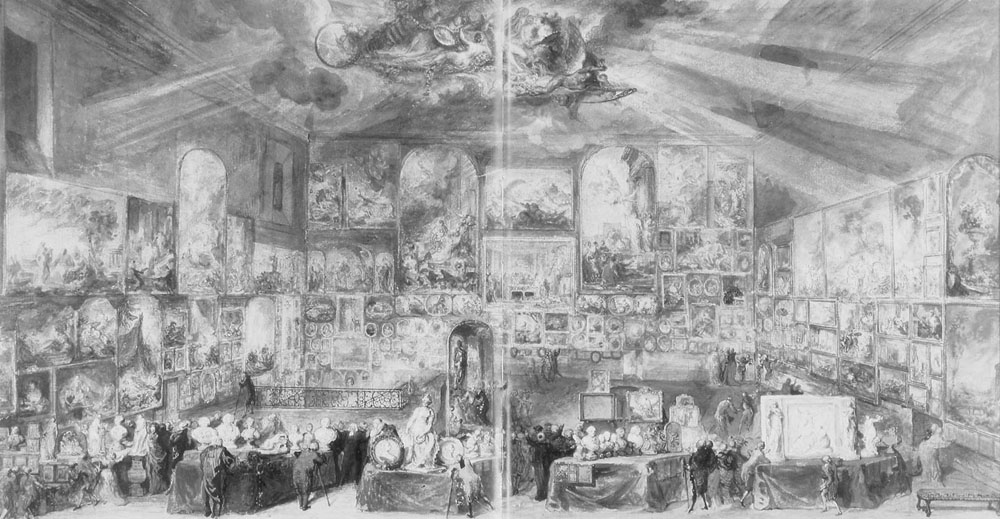
The Salon in 1767, by Gabriel de Saint-Aubin

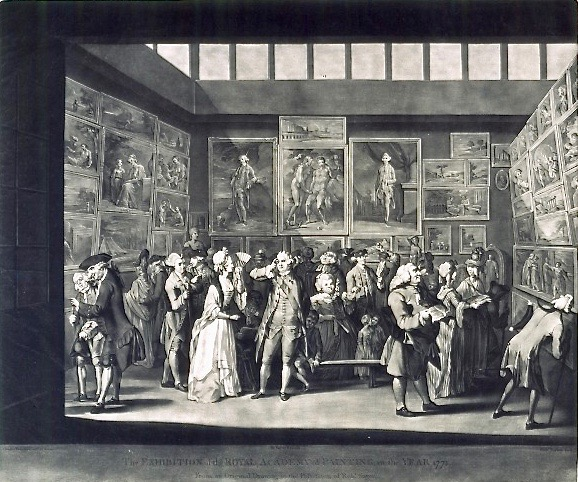
The Salon in 1771, engraving after Charles Brandoin

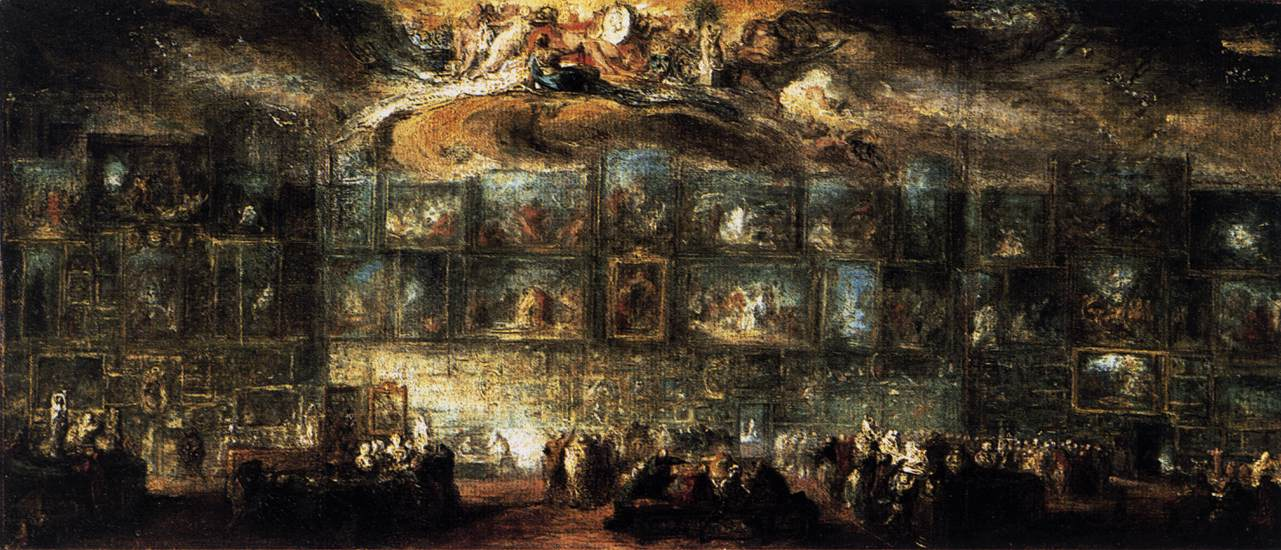
The Salon in 1779, by Gabriel de Saint-Aubin (Louvre)

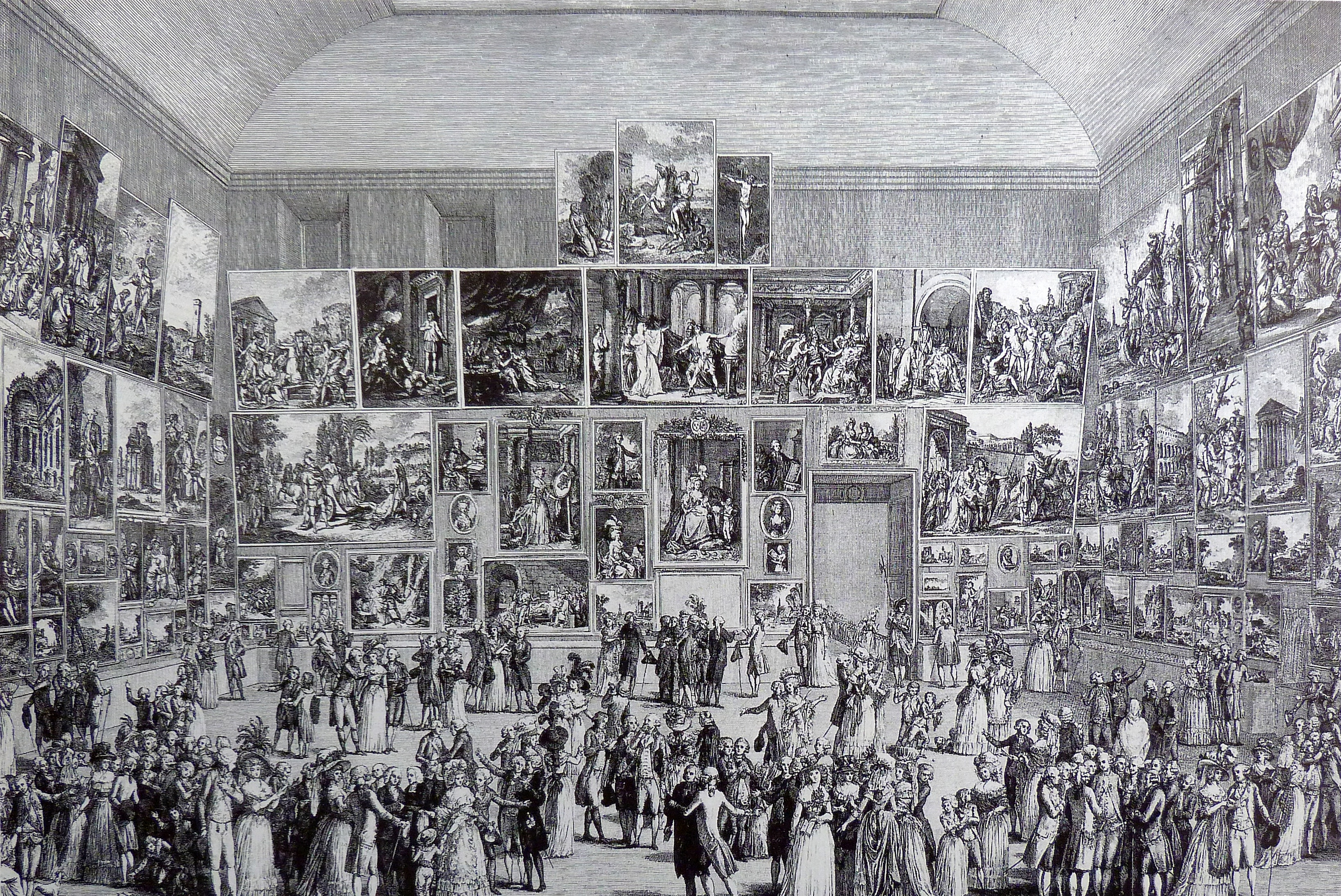
The Salon in 1787, engraving by Pietro Antonio Martini

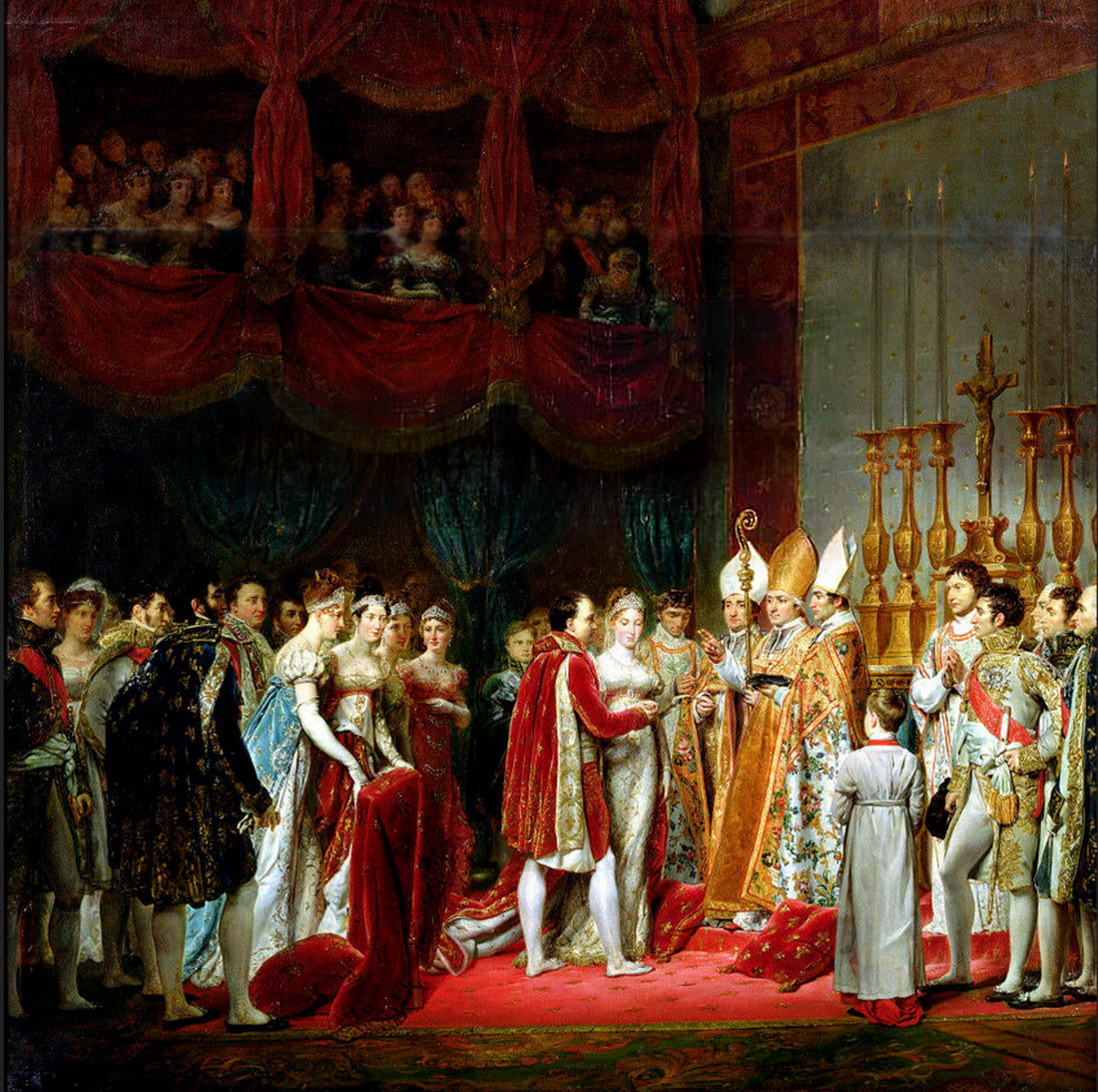
The Wedding of Napoleon and Marie Louise by Georges Rouget, 1810 (Palace of Versailles)

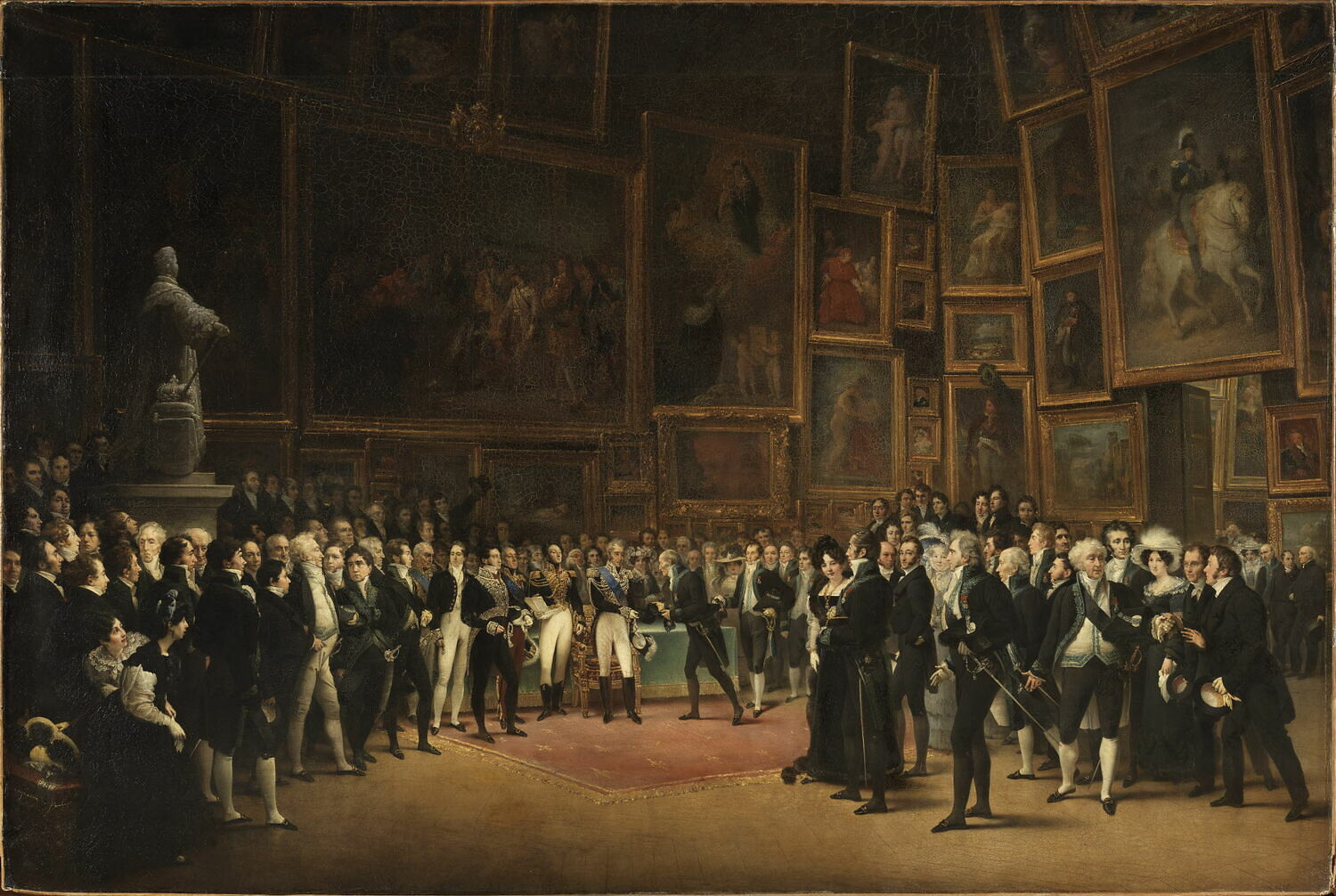
Charles X at the Salon of 1824, by François Joseph Heim (Louvre)

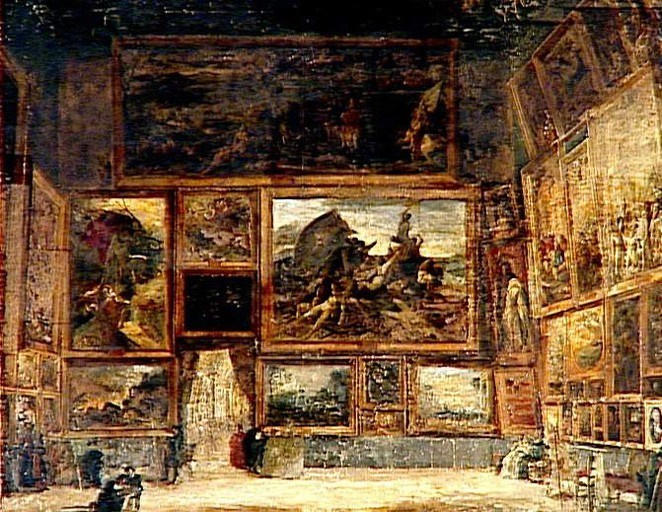
The Salon in 1831 with Théodore Géricault's The Raft of the Medusa, by Nicolas Sébastien Maillot (Louvre)

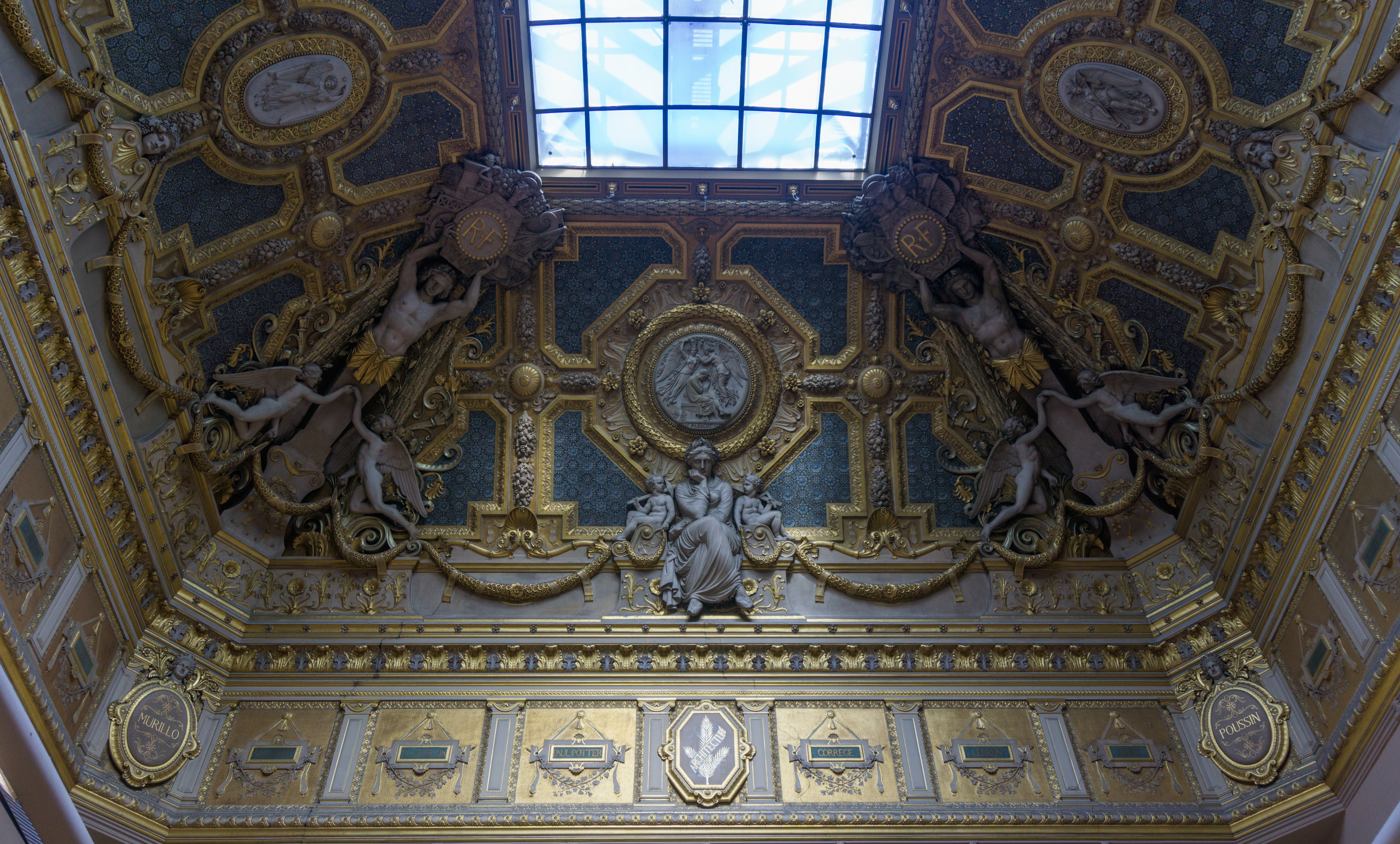
Detail of the ceiling designed by Duban in 1849-1850

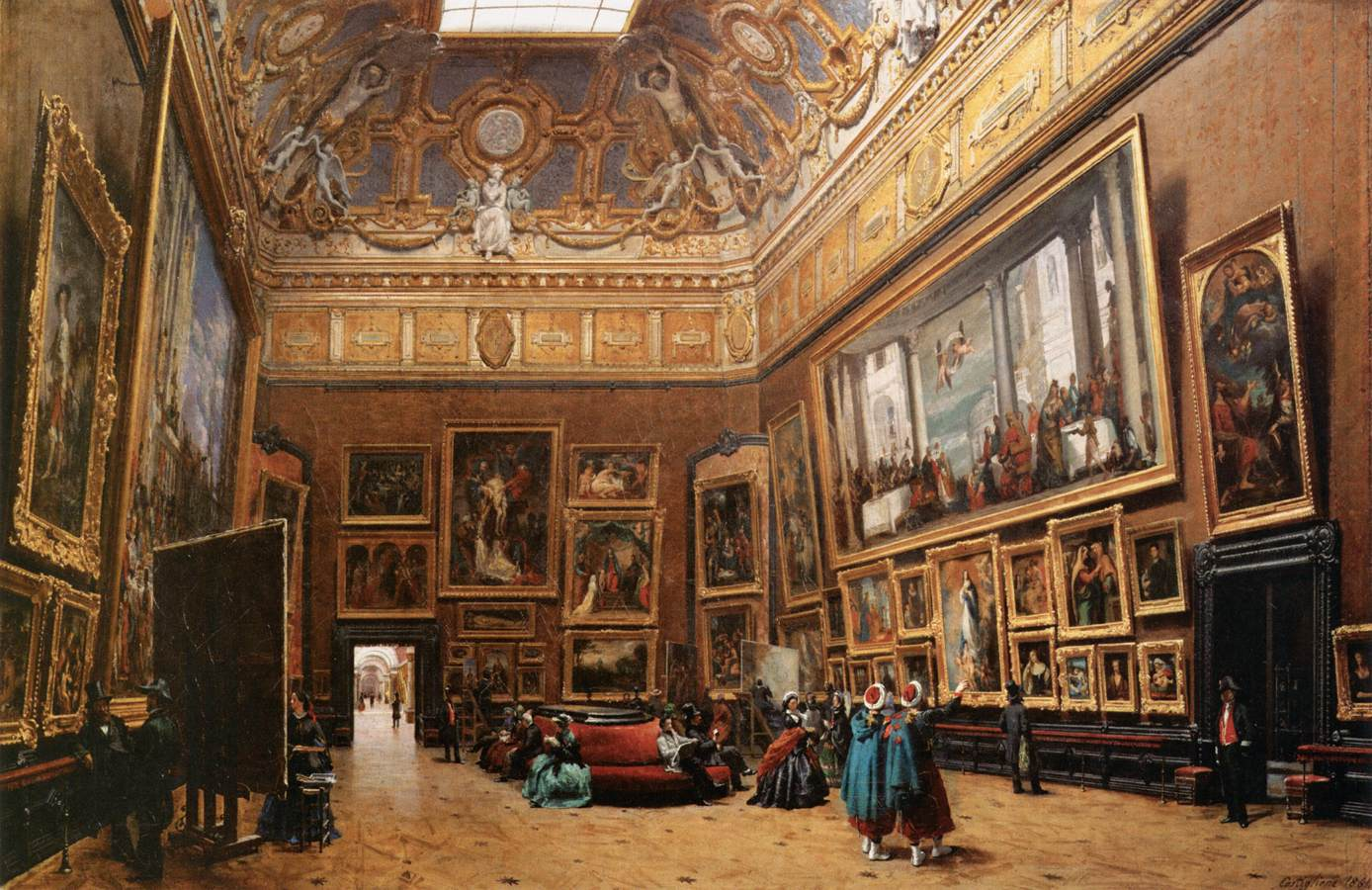
The Salon Carré in 1861, by Giuseppe Castiglione (Louvre)

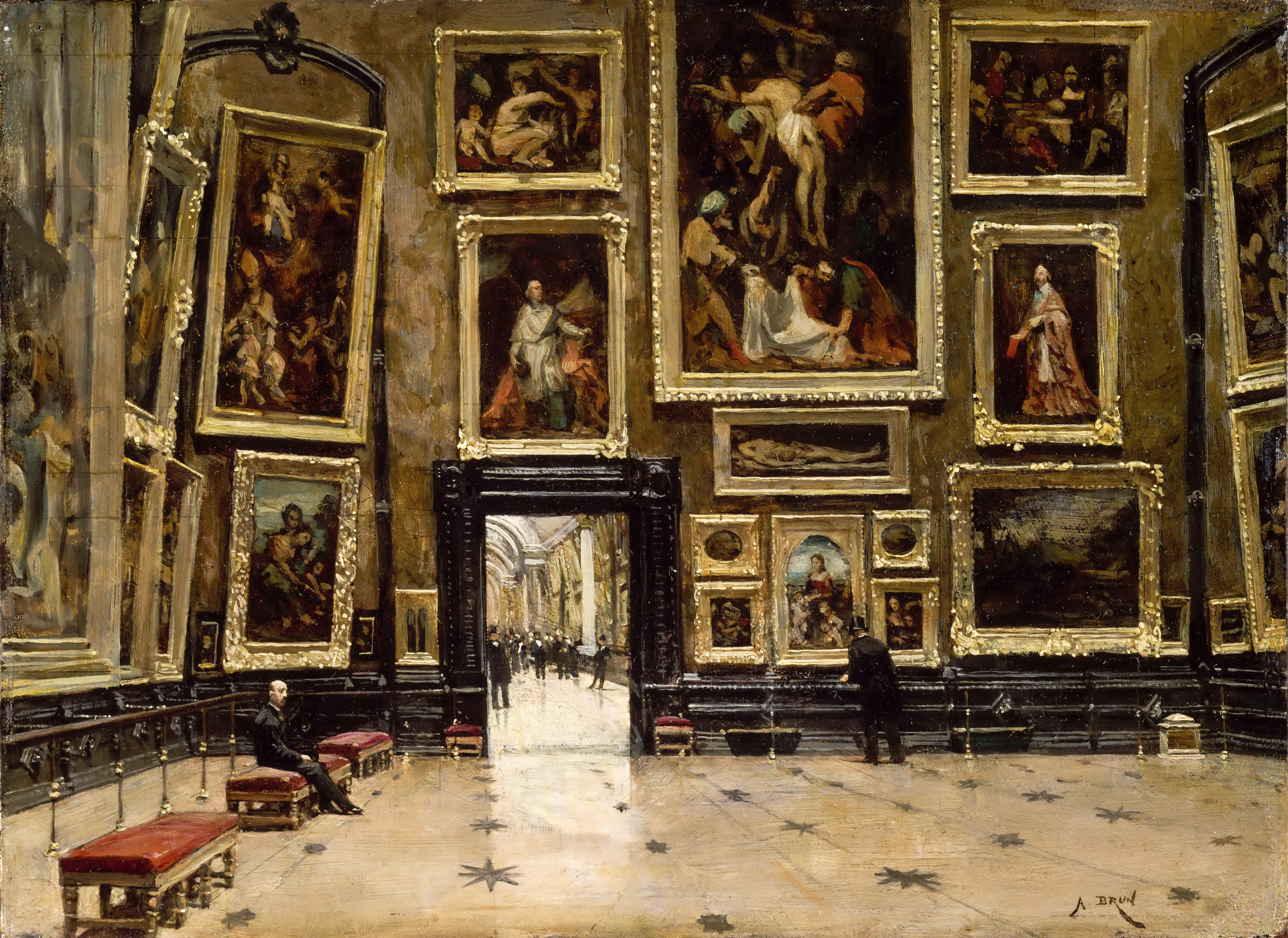
Salon Carré around 1880, by Alexandre Jean-Baptiste Brun (Louvre)

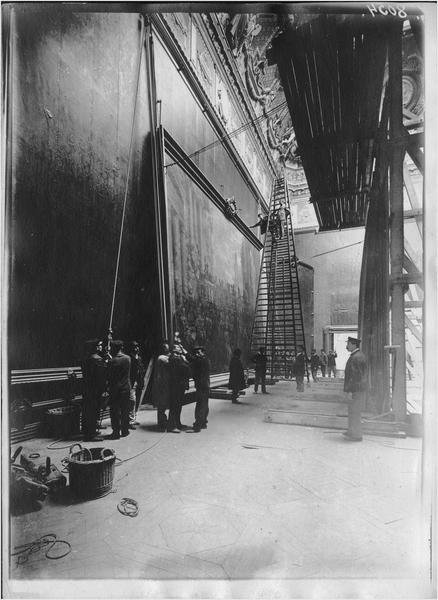
Re-installation of Veronese's The Wedding at Cana in 1918

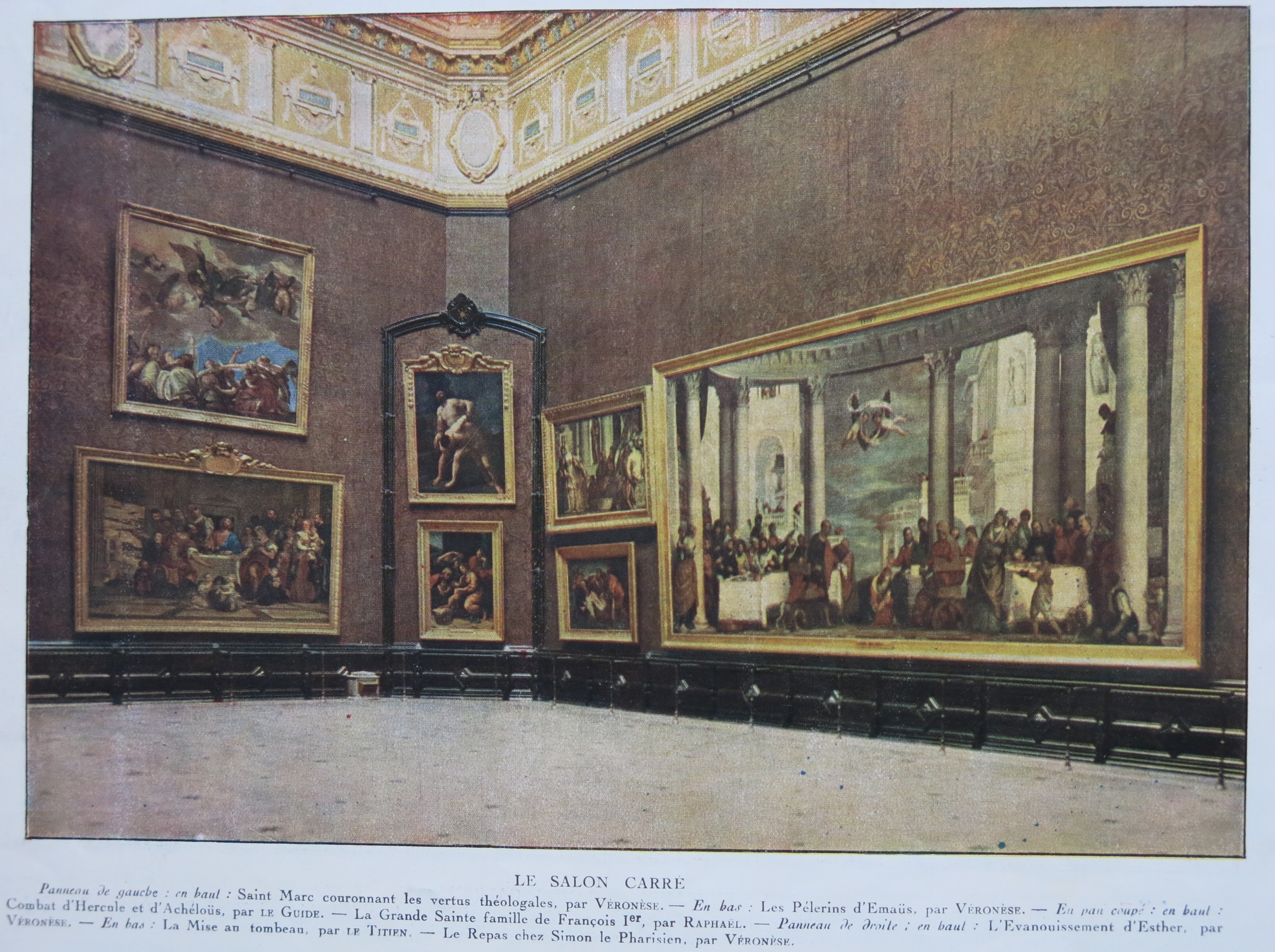
Salon Carré in 1929, in L'Illustration

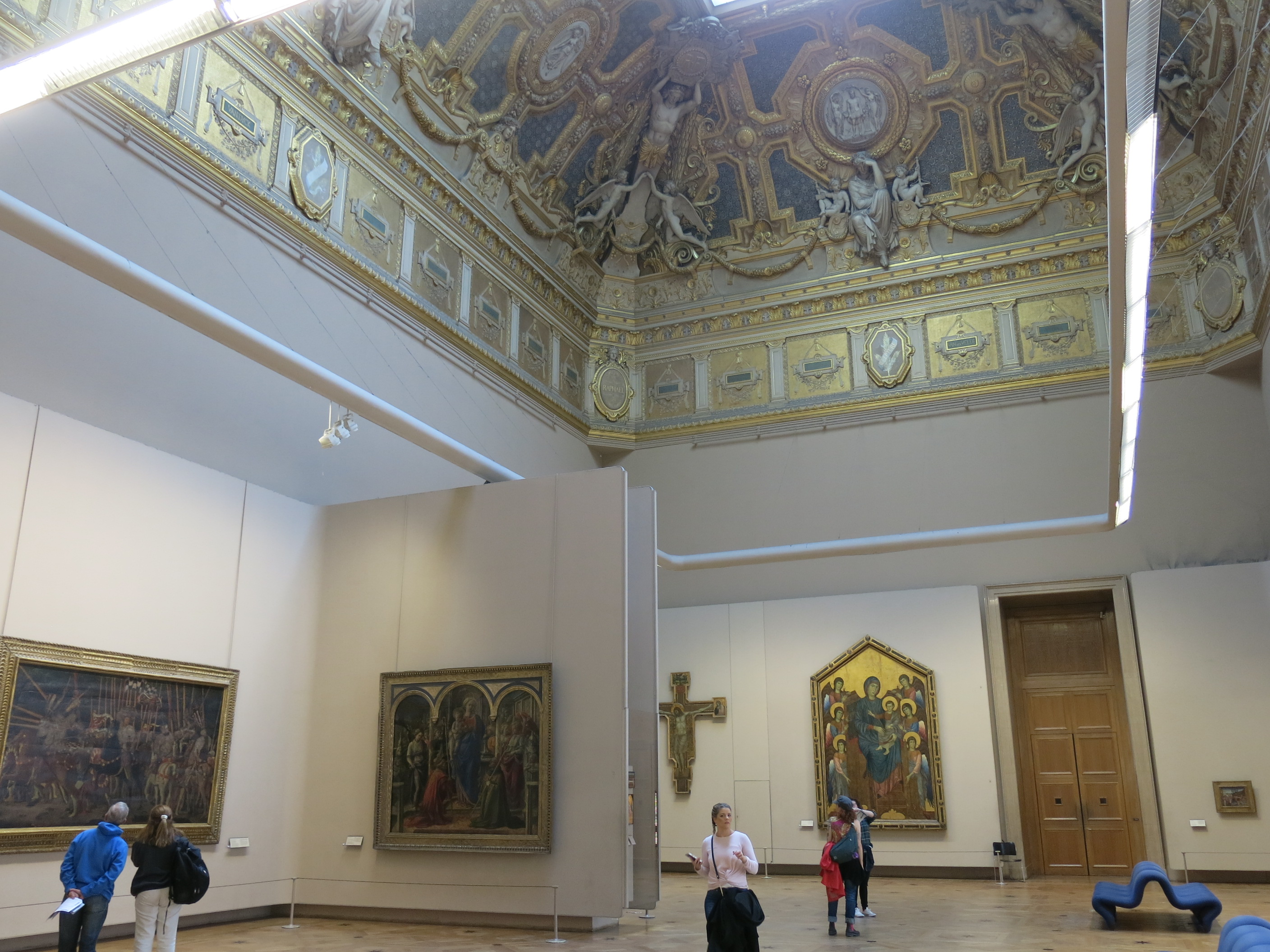
Marc Saltet's 1972 museography with seat designed in 1967 by Pierre Paulin

== See also ==
- Petite Galerie of the Louvre
- Galerie d'Apollon
- Grande Galerie
- Escalier Daru
