= Lassalle =

Lassalle is a surname, originally a Gasconic patronymic. People with the name include:

- Agnès Lassalle, French murder victim
- Camille-Léopold Cabaillot-Lassalle (1839-1902), French painter
- Ferdinand Lassalle (1825–64), German socialist
- Gilbert Duclos-Lassalle (born 1954), French cyclist
- Hugo Enomiya-Lassalle (1898–1990), Jesuit priest and Zen Buddhist
- Jean Lassalle (1847–1909), French operatic baritone
- Jean Lassalle (born 1955), French politician
- Rex Lassalle (1945–2025), Trinidad-Tobago lieutenant and mutineer
- Robert Lassalle (1882–1940), French politician
