= The Chamber of Deputies Received at the Palais-Royal by the Duke of Orleans =

Painting by François Joseph Heim

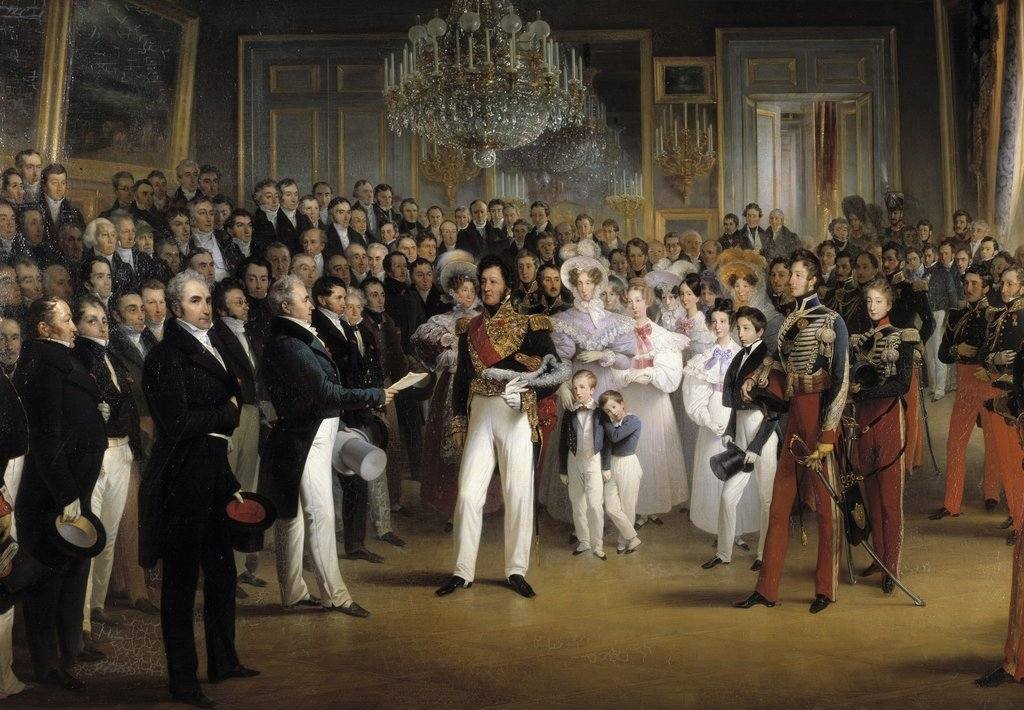
- Detail of the larger painting
- Artist: François Joseph Heim
- Year: 1834
- Type: Oil on canvas, history painting
- Dimensions: 230 cm × 340 cm (91 in × 130 in)
- Location: Palace of Versailles, Versailles

The Chamber of Deputies Received at the Palais-Royal by the Duke of Orleans (French: La chambre des deputes appelant le duc d'Orleans) is an 1834 history painting by the French artist François Joseph Heim. It portrays a scene from the July Revolution. On 7 August members of the Chamber of Deputies arrived at the Palais-Royal, the Paris residence of the Duke of Orleans. They came to formally offer him the throne that had been abdicated by his distant cousin Charles X. He accepted the offer and took the throne as Louis Philippe I beginning the July Monarchy which lasted until 1848.

Amongst the large number of figures featured in the painting are the politicians Casimir Pierre Périer ans Jacques Laffitte and various members of the new royal family. These include the new king's sons Ferdinand Philippe and the Duke of Nemours as well as his wife Maria Amalia and influential sister Adelaide. The painting was commissioned for 10,000 Francs by Louis Philippe I in 1832 for the planned Museum of French History at the Palace of Versailles. The work was displayed at the Salon of 1834 held at the Louvre. It also featured at the Exposition Universelle in 1889. Heim produced another painting depicting the day's events in 1837.

== Bibliography ==
- Boime, Albert. Art in an Age of Counterrevolution, 1815-1848. University of Chicago Press, 2004.
- Price, Munro. The Perilous Crown: France Between Revolutions, 1814-1848. Pan Macmillan, 2010.
