= Charles X Distributing Awards to Artists =

Painting by François Joseph Heim

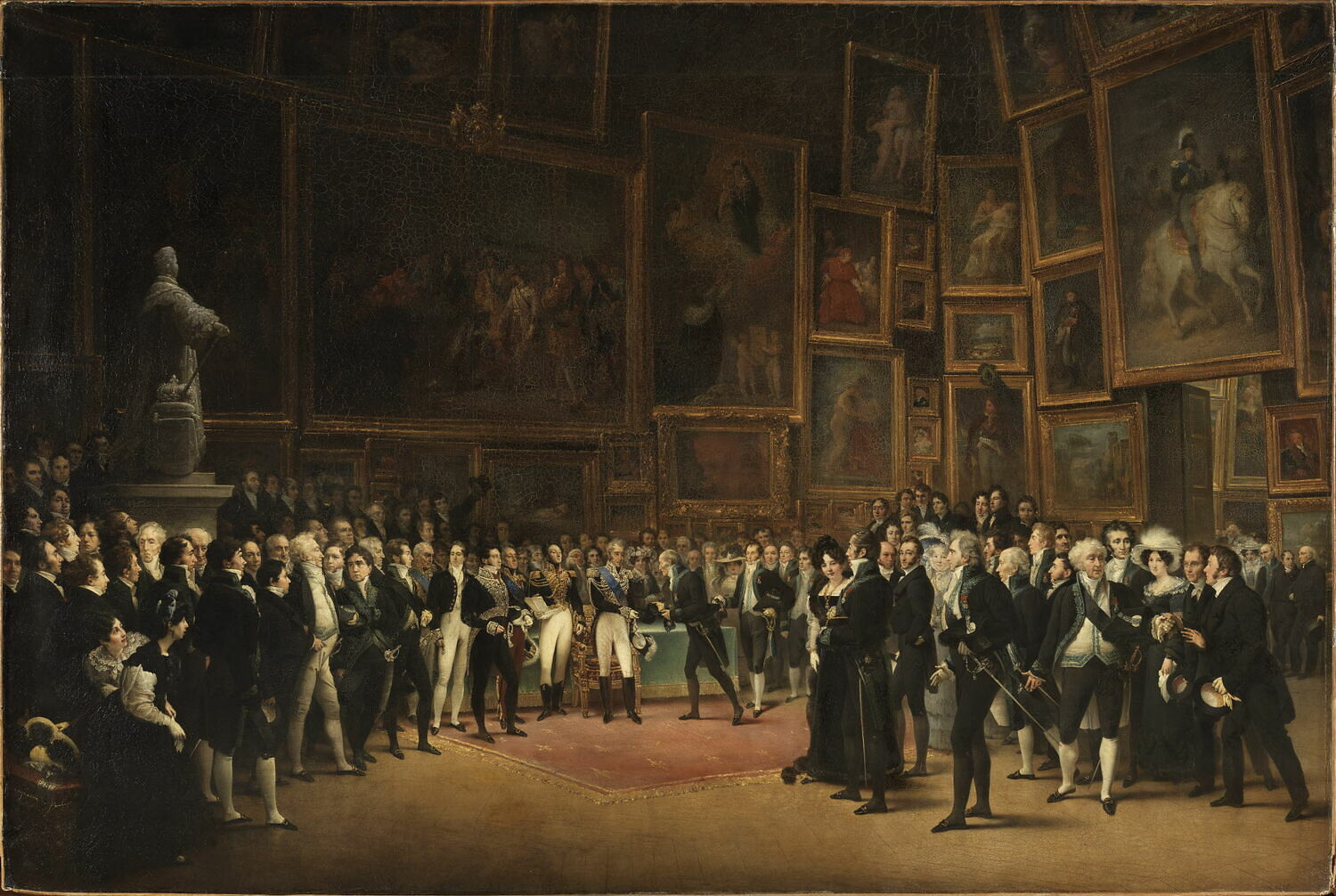
- Artist: François Joseph Heim
- Year: 1827
- Type: Oil on canvas, history painting
- Dimensions: 173 cm × 256 cm (68 in × 101 in)
- Location: Louvre, Paris

Charles X Distributing Awards to Artists (French: Charles X distribuant des récompenses aux artistes exposants du salon de 1824 au Louvre, le 15 Janvier 1825) is an 1827 painting by the French artist François Joseph Heim. It depicts the French monarch Charles X awarding the Legion of Honour to artists who exhibited at the Paris Salon of 1824 at a ceremony held on 15 January 1825. The King who had succeeded his brother Louis XVIII in 1824 is shown in the uniform of the National Guard. It features portraits of many of the leading artists of the era. The royal official Ambroise-Polycarpe de La Rochefoucauld and the director of the Louvre Louis Nicolas Philippe Auguste de Forbin are shown close to the king. Heim became a celebrated depicter of scenes of the Bourbon Restoration. It is now in the collection of the Louvre and is displayed in the Salon Carré.

The painting was exhibited at the Salon of 1827 held at the Louvre It also featured in the Salon of 1855 a major retrospective of art held we part of the Exposition Universelle.

== See also ==
- Portrait of Charles X, 1825 work by Thomas Lawrence

== Bibliography ==
- Bouillo, Eva. Le Salon de 1827: classique ou romantique?. Presses universitaires de Rennes, 2009.
- De Saint-Amand, Imbert . The Duchess of Berry and the Court of Charles X. C. Scribner's Sons, 1892.
- Mansel, Philip. Dressed to Rule: Royal and Court Costume from Louis XIV to Elizabeth II. Yale University Press, 2005.
- Moon, Iris & Taws, Richard. Time, Media, and Visuality in Post-Revolutionary France. Bloomsbury Publishing USA, 2021.
