= François Joseph Heim =

French painter (1787–1865)

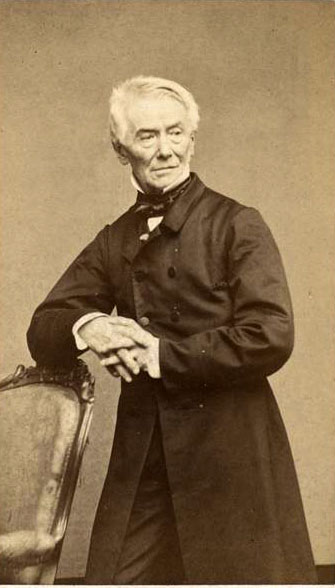
- Heim in a photograph by Étienne Carjat (1865)
- Born: 16 December 1787; Belfort, France
- Died: 29 September 1865 (aged 72)
- Education: École Centrale of Strasbourg
- Style: History painting
- Awards: Legion of Honour; 1807 Prix de Rome

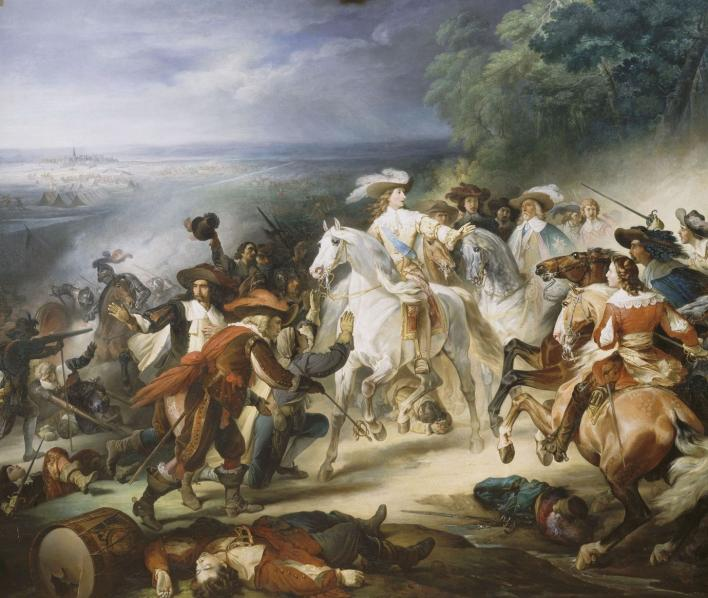
Battle of Rocroi, 1834

François Joseph Heim (16 December 1787 – 29 September 1865) was a French painter known especially for his history paintings and portraits.

== Biography ==
He was born at Belfort. His father, Joseph Heim, was a drawing professor. Heim early distinguished himself at the École Centrale of Strasbourg, and in 1803 entered the studio of Vincent at Paris. He was a fellow student of Horace Vernet. He won the second place in the 1806 Prix de Rome. In 1807 he obtained the first prize, and in 1812 he exhibited his picture of "The Arrival of Jacob in Mesopotomia" (Bordeaux Musée des Beaux-Arts) in the Salon, where it won for him a gold medal of the first class. He was again awarded a gold medal in 1817, when he exhibited, together with other works, a St John—bought by Vivant Denon. And Jacob appeared again as he submitted Joseph's Coat Brought Back to Jacob to the Salon of 1817.

In 1819 the Resurrection of Lazarus (Cathedral Autun), the Martyrdom of St Cyr (St Gervais), and two scenes from the life of Vespasian (ordered by the king) attracted attention. In 1823 the Re-erection of the Royal Tombs at St Denis, the Martyrdom of St Laurence (Nôtre Dame) and several full-length portraits increased the painter's popularity; and in 1824, when he exhibited his great canvas, the Massacre of the Jews (Louvre), Heim was rewarded with the Legion of Honour.

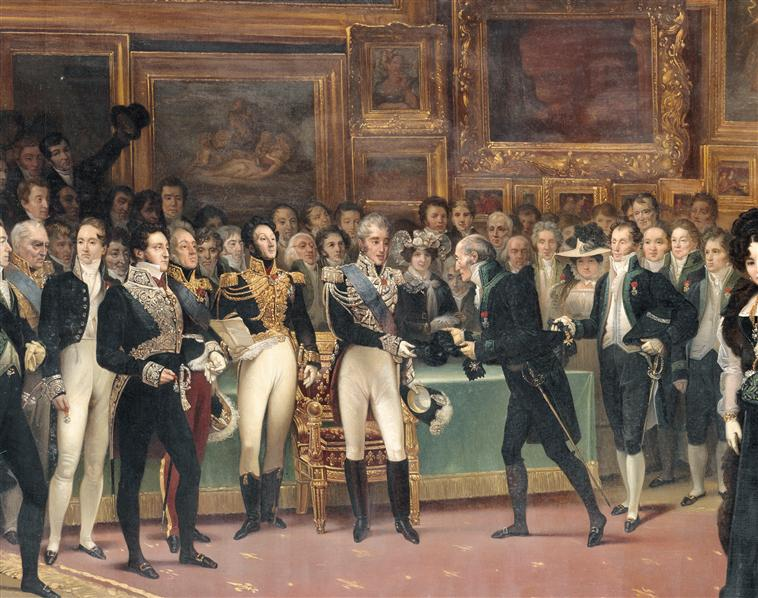
Fame arrived for Heim with Charles X Rewarding Artists, and he was regarded as the "Bourbons' appointed artist".

In 1827 appeared the King giving away Prizes at the Salon of 1824 (Louvre; engraved by Jazet), the picture by which Heim is best known, and "Saint Hyacinthe". Fame arrived with Charles X Rewarding Artists, and he was regarded as the "Bourbons' appointed artist". Heim was now commissioned to decorate the Gallery Charles X (Louvre). Though ridiculed by the Romanticists, Heim was elected to the Institute in 1829, shortly after which he commenced a series of drawings of the celebrities of his day. Commissions did not dry up during the July Monarchy, though he was criticized for his academicism.

His decorations of the Conference room of the Chamber of Deputies were completed in 1844; and in 1847 his works at the Salon "Champ de Mai" and "Reading a Play at the Théâtre Français" were the signal for violent criticisms. Yet something like a turn of opinion in his favour took place at the exhibition of 1851; his powers as draughtsman and the occasional merits of his composition were recognized, and toleration extended even to his colour. The Second Empire saw Heim's popularity resurrect. He was appointed President of the Académie des Beaux-Arts in 1853 and had a great success at the World Exhibition of 1855 with The Victories of Judas Macabaeus and The Battle of Rocroy.

Heim was awarded the great gold medal, and in 1855—having sent to the Salon no less than sixteen portraits, amongst which may be cited those of Cuvier, Geoffroy de St Hilaire, and Madame Hersent he was made officer of the legion of honour. In 1859 he again exhibited a curious collection of portraits, sixty-four members of the Institute arranged in groups of four. The poet Baudelaire admired his sketches for their "marvellous understanding of the way humans pull faces".

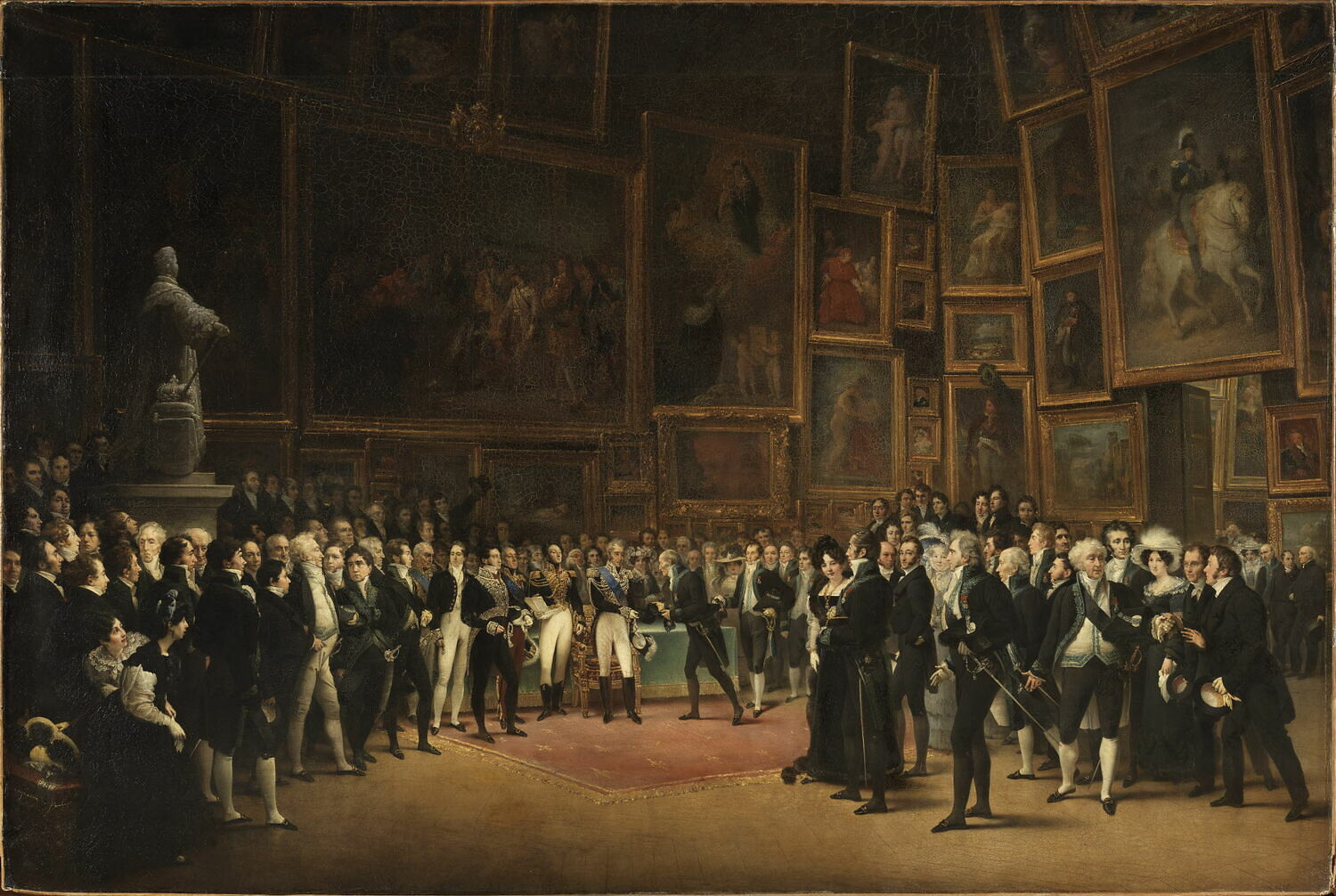
Heim's painting, Charles X Distributing Awards to Artists Exhibiting at the Salon of 1824 at the Louvre January 15th 1825 (1827)

Besides the paintings already mentioned, there is to be seen in Nôtre Dame de Lorette (Paris) a work executed on the spot; and the museum of Strassburg contains an excellent example of his easel pictures, the subject of which is a Shepherd Drinking from a Spring. He also decorated the Palais Bourbon and the Hotel de Lassay. Jean-Pierre Cuzin, curator of paintings in the Louvre, has called Heim "perhaps the last representative in France of what could be called traditional painting and, as such, somewhat out of place in the middle of the nineteenth century." Baudelaire called him "an eminent, distinguished artist, a searcher who misses being a fine genius by only a millimetre or a milligram of anything."

The writer Jean-Paul Kauffmann, who was himself a prisoner (1983–1988), having been kidnapped while working as a journalist in Lebanon has praised Heim's work and in particular a work of 1840 in the gallery at Semur-en-Auxois called The Prisoner, of which he said: "The drawing is superb, and the pose conveys the anguish of silent suffering—and the very Caravaggesque sense of light and setting cannot fail to make the viewer curious."

== Gallery ==
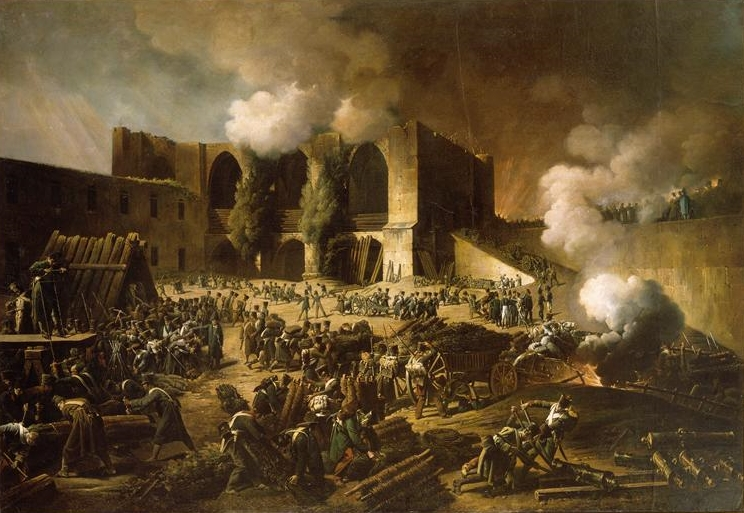
Siege of Burgos, 1813

Titus Pardons the Conspiring Senators, 1819

Titus and Vespasian Distribute Aid to the People, 1819

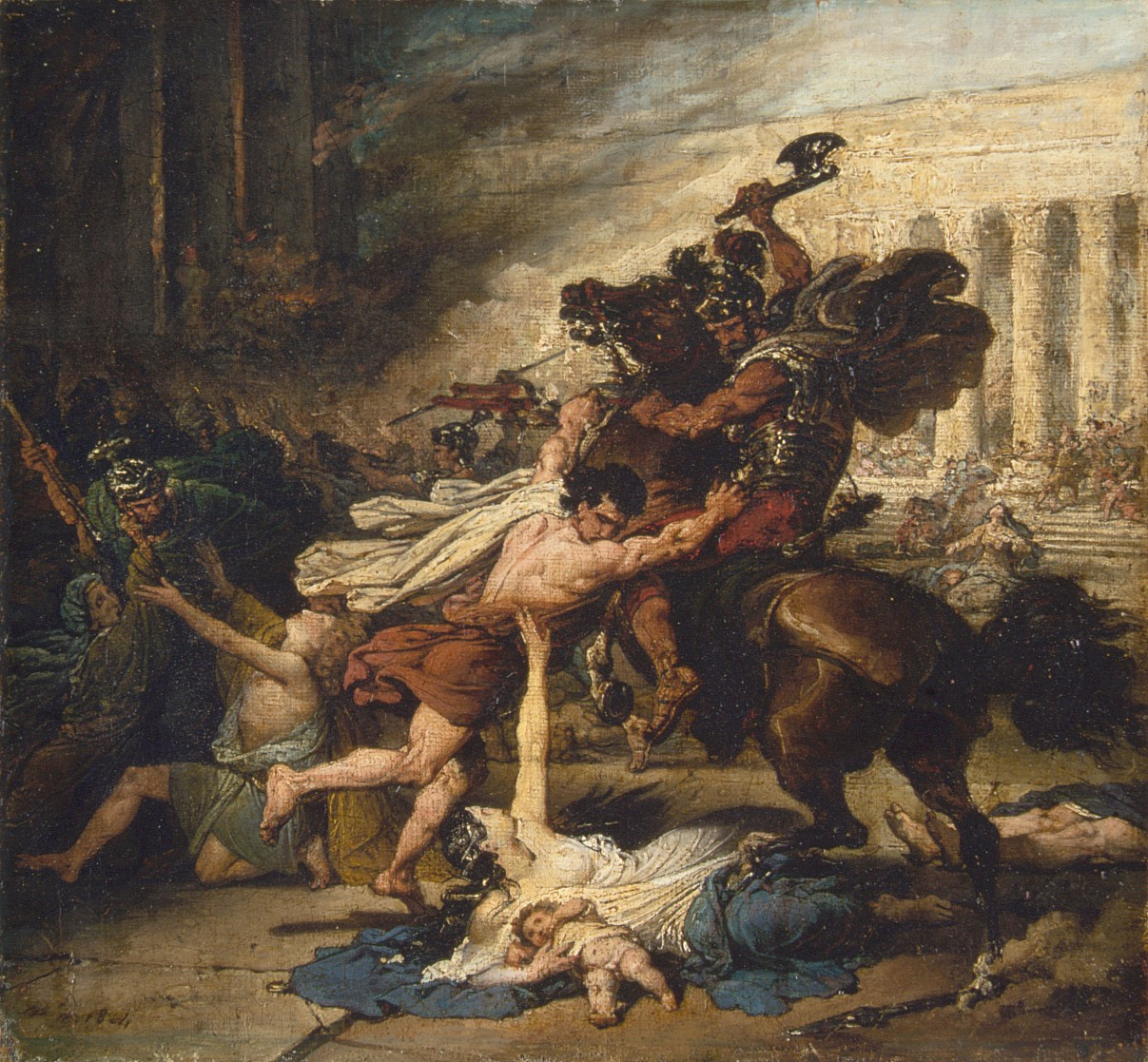
The Sack of Jerusalem by the Romans, 1824

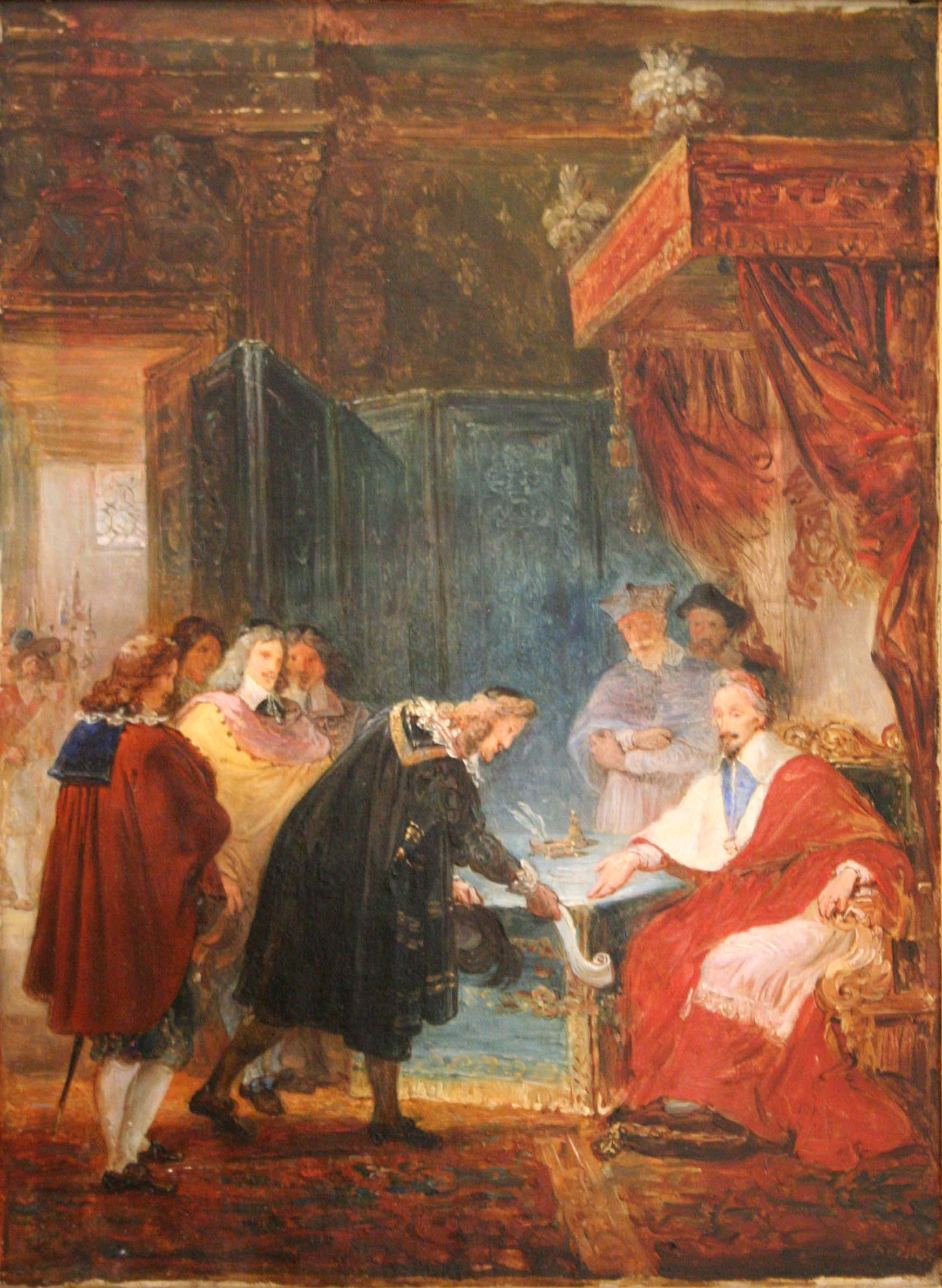
Cardinal Richelieu, 1833

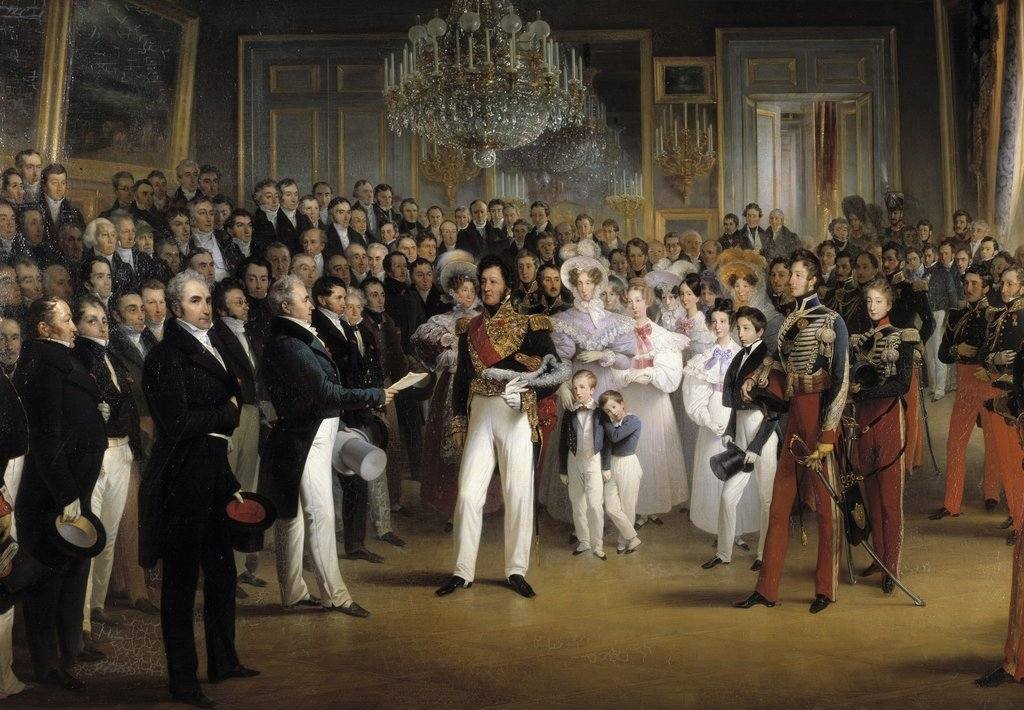
The Chamber of Deputies Received at the Palais-Royal by the Duke of Orleans, 1834

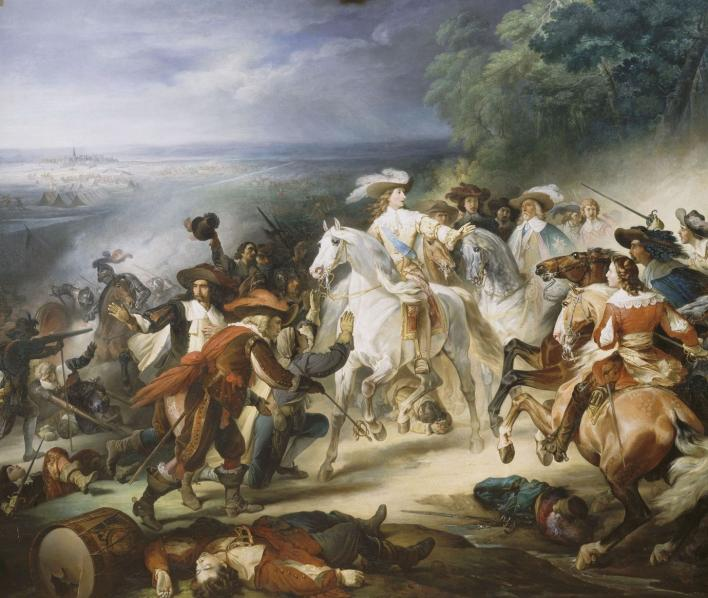
Battle of Rocroi, 1834

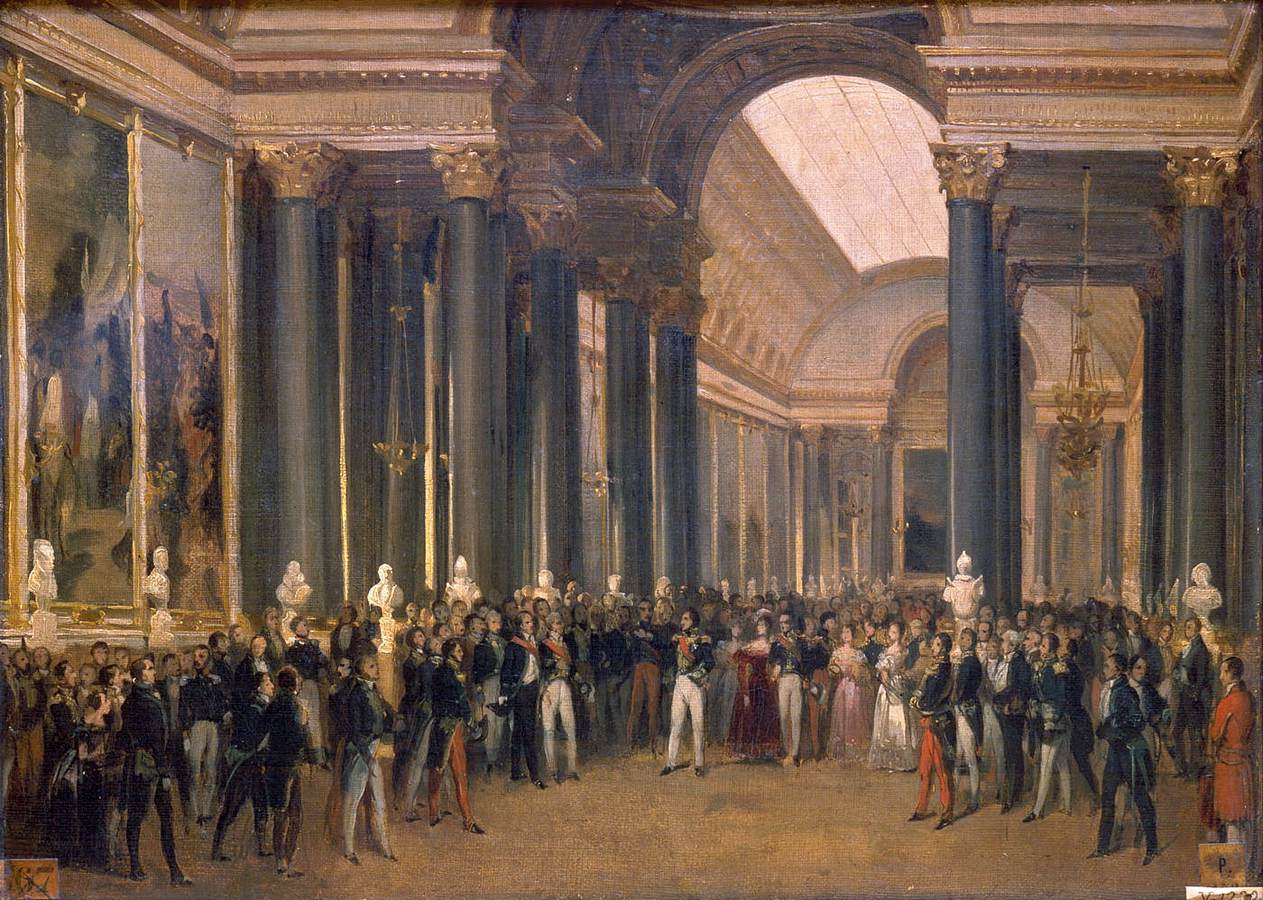
Louis-Philippe opening the Galerie des Batailles, 1837

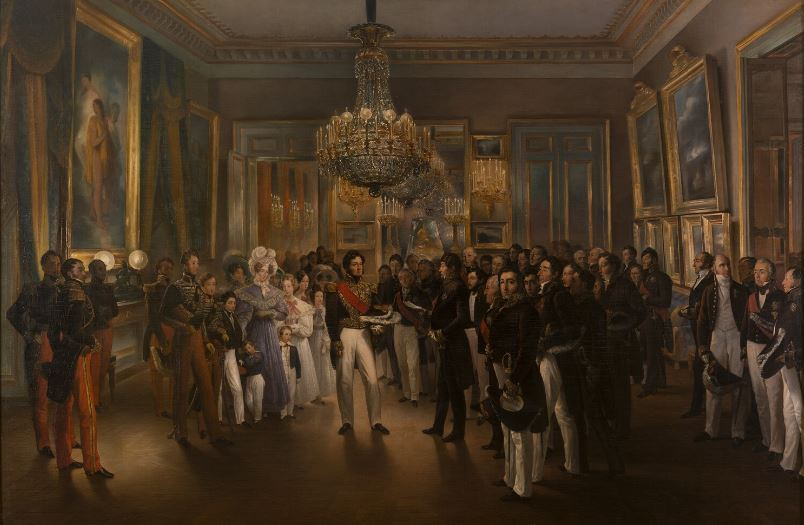
Le duc d'Orléans reçoit au Palais-Royal la Chambre des pairs, 1837

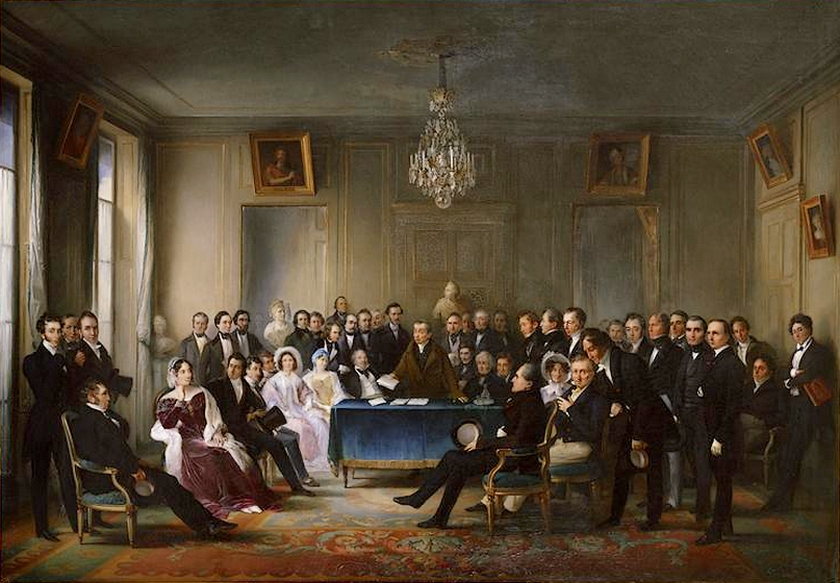
la Comédie Française 1828, 1847

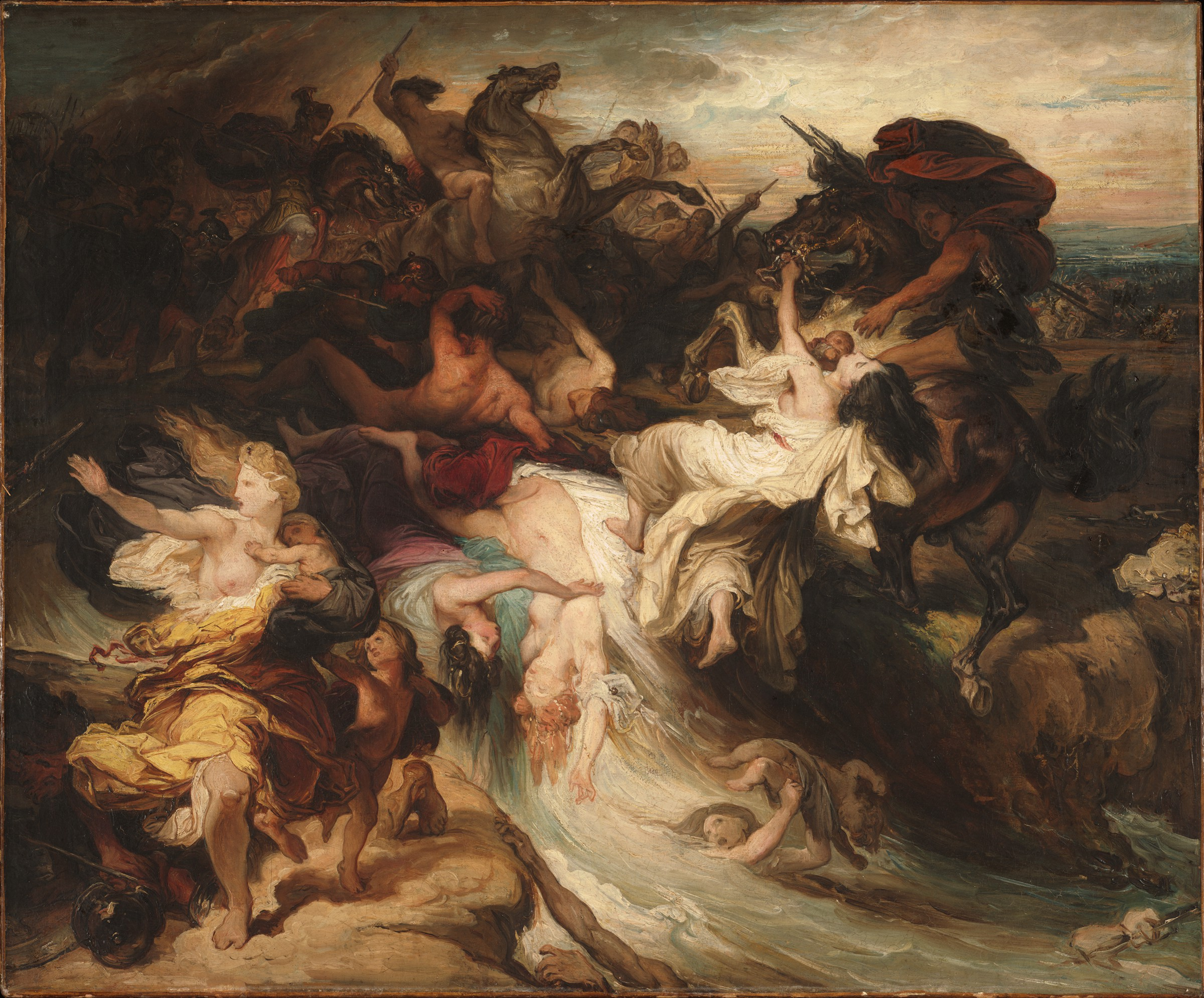
Defeat of the Cimbri and the Teutons by Marius, 1853
