= Camille-Léopold Cabaillot-Lassalle =

French painter (1839-1902)

Cabaillot-Lassalle
- Born: September 8, 1839; Paris, France
- Died: January 9, 1902 (aged 62); Paris, France
- Known for: Interior genre scenes

Camille-Léopold Cabaillot, known as Cabaillot-Lassalle, born on September 8, 1839 in Paris and died in the same city on January 9, 1902, was a French painter. He specialized in interior genre scenes, representing young bourgeois women and their children in their domestic activities, he was the son of the painter Louis Simon Cabaillot, called Louis Lassalle.

== Life ==
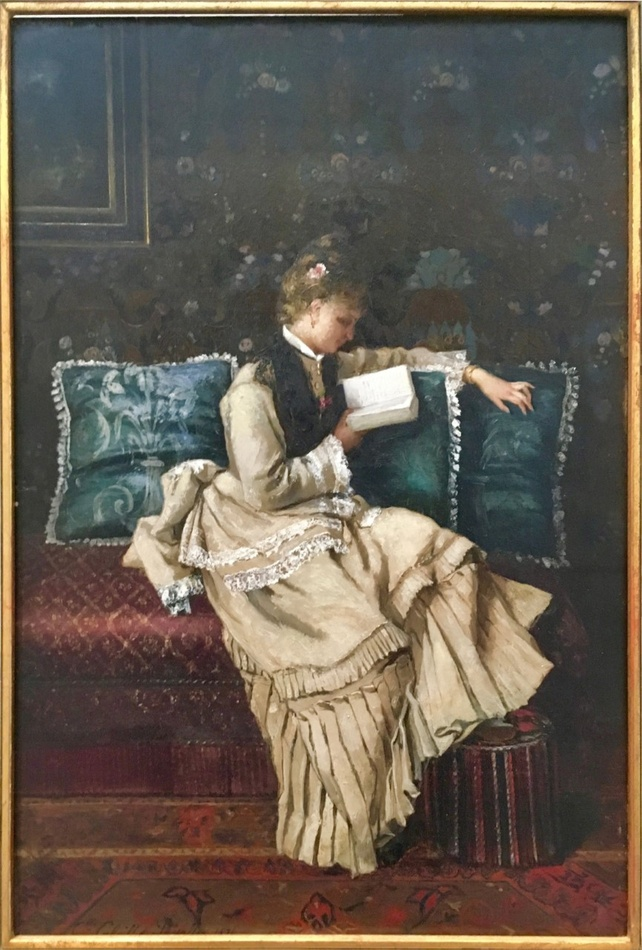
Lecture dans le boudoir (reading in the boudoir, 1874, Fine Arts Museum of Liège).

Camille-Léopold Cabaillot was born on September 8, 1839, in Paris. His father, Louis Simon Cabaillot (1808-1885) was a Parisian painter known for his genre scenes of children in a naïve style and signed under the pseudonym Louis Lassalle. Camille-Léopold Cabaillot adopted the pseudonym by adding it to his birth name, thus recalling their filiation while distinguishing himself from his father.

After an initial apprenticeship with his father, Cabaillot-Lassalle took lessons from Pierre Édouard Frère (1819-1886) at the Écouen painters' colony. He specialized in interior genre scenes, depicting young bourgeois women and their children in their domestic activities.

== Works ==
These depictions of refined interiors, both intimate and mundane, were extremely popular in the second half of the nineteenth century in Europe and the United States. Individual and family portraits were commissioned by high society, as the Belle Époque corresponded to the golden age of the bourgeoisie, a relatively peaceful and stable period between the great European nations and multiple innovations in industry and technology bringing further improvement to the standard of living of high society.

Cabaillot-Lassalle's work is closely related to that of his Belgian contemporary Alfred Stevens, the great successful painter of the Parisian bourgeoisie and the elegant and elaborate fashion of the Second Empire style. While the textures of the fabrics are of a more modest character in Cabaillot-Lassalle, described with less subtlety and detail, there is nevertheless the same attention to the rendering of hands, the opulence of the interior depicted, the atmosphere of luxury expressed by the tapestries, furniture and clothing.

Cabaillot-Lassalle's paintings are generally small and medium-sized, rarely measuring more than 50 cm.
