= Pietro Antonio Martini =

Italian painter (1738–1797)

Pietro Antonio Martini (9 July 1738 – 2 April 1797) was an Italian painter and engraver, active in a late Baroque style.

== Biography ==
He was born at Trecasali, within the duchy of Parma, a relative of the painter Biagio Martini. Pietro's father wished him to study law, but he arranged to have some training locally under Giuseppe Baldrighi in design, and then Benigno Bossi. In 1761, he won a prize at the Academy of Fine Arts of Parma. In 1769, with the patronage of the minister of the Duchy du Tillot and perhaps under the encouragement of the court architect Petitot, Pietro went to Paris to learn engraving working with Jacques-Philippe Le Bas. With the dismissal of du Tillot in 1771, his subsidy stopped, but he demurred in returning to Parma to settle, since he was no longer assured a post as professor of engraving in the Parmesan Academy of Fine Arts. He set forth on traveling through Italy, then up to Netherlands, and finally London. In 1787, he had a prominent exhibition of his prints. In 1792, he was awarded the position of Academic Professor of the Parmesan Academy, but continued to travel, until the French Revolution prompted him to return to Parma.

One of the subjects of his etchings was views of late 18th-century art exhibitions themselves. For example, one etching depicts the 1785 Salon exhibition at the Louvre; another engraving depicts a View of the Salon of 1785; and a third, the Exhibition of the Royal Academy in 1787. These engravings are historically instructive in demonstrating the crowded stacked displays of artworks utilized in this period. Other etchings indicated that the admiring crowds may have been a stock image for use in other similar engravings.

Among his etchings are the following:

- Plates after Teniers and other Flemish artists
- Heliodorus driven from the Temple, after Francesco Solimena
- Christ driving the Money-changors from the Temple, after Solimena
- Architectural Ruins, after Robert
- Pleasures of Summer, after Horace Vernet
- View of Spoletto, after Vernet
- View of Porto Ercole, after Vernet
- View of Avignon, after Vernet
- The Augurs, after Salvatore Rosa; etched by Martini, finished by le Bas.
- Il Contento, after Adam Elsheimer
